

147001–147100 

|-bgcolor=#fefefe
| 147001 ||  || — || August 13, 2002 || Socorro || LINEAR || FLO || align=right | 1.2 km || 
|-id=002 bgcolor=#fefefe
| 147002 ||  || — || August 13, 2002 || Anderson Mesa || LONEOS || V || align=right | 1.0 km || 
|-id=003 bgcolor=#fefefe
| 147003 ||  || — || August 13, 2002 || Anderson Mesa || LONEOS || V || align=right | 1.1 km || 
|-id=004 bgcolor=#fefefe
| 147004 ||  || — || August 14, 2002 || Socorro || LINEAR || — || align=right | 1.3 km || 
|-id=005 bgcolor=#fefefe
| 147005 ||  || — || August 14, 2002 || Socorro || LINEAR || V || align=right | 1.7 km || 
|-id=006 bgcolor=#fefefe
| 147006 ||  || — || August 14, 2002 || Socorro || LINEAR || — || align=right | 1.4 km || 
|-id=007 bgcolor=#fefefe
| 147007 ||  || — || August 14, 2002 || Socorro || LINEAR || FLO || align=right | 1.3 km || 
|-id=008 bgcolor=#fefefe
| 147008 ||  || — || August 14, 2002 || Socorro || LINEAR || — || align=right | 1.0 km || 
|-id=009 bgcolor=#fefefe
| 147009 ||  || — || August 15, 2002 || Anderson Mesa || LONEOS || — || align=right | 1.6 km || 
|-id=010 bgcolor=#fefefe
| 147010 ||  || — || August 14, 2002 || Socorro || LINEAR || — || align=right | 1.3 km || 
|-id=011 bgcolor=#fefefe
| 147011 ||  || — || August 15, 2002 || Goodricke-Pigott || Goodricke-Pigott Obs. || — || align=right | 1.3 km || 
|-id=012 bgcolor=#fefefe
| 147012 ||  || — || August 8, 2002 || Anderson Mesa || LONEOS || — || align=right | 1.1 km || 
|-id=013 bgcolor=#fefefe
| 147013 ||  || — || August 11, 2002 || Haleakala || NEAT || FLO || align=right | 1.2 km || 
|-id=014 bgcolor=#fefefe
| 147014 || 2002 QF || — || August 16, 2002 || Socorro || LINEAR || — || align=right | 1.9 km || 
|-id=015 bgcolor=#fefefe
| 147015 ||  || — || August 27, 2002 || Palomar || NEAT || — || align=right | 1.2 km || 
|-id=016 bgcolor=#fefefe
| 147016 ||  || — || August 28, 2002 || Palomar || NEAT || — || align=right | 1.4 km || 
|-id=017 bgcolor=#fefefe
| 147017 ||  || — || August 29, 2002 || Palomar || NEAT || NYS || align=right | 1.1 km || 
|-id=018 bgcolor=#fefefe
| 147018 ||  || — || August 29, 2002 || Palomar || NEAT || MAS || align=right data-sort-value="0.93" | 930 m || 
|-id=019 bgcolor=#fefefe
| 147019 ||  || — || August 30, 2002 || Socorro || LINEAR || — || align=right | 1.3 km || 
|-id=020 bgcolor=#fefefe
| 147020 ||  || — || August 19, 2002 || Palomar || NEAT || — || align=right | 1.2 km || 
|-id=021 bgcolor=#fefefe
| 147021 ||  || — || August 18, 2002 || Palomar || NEAT || — || align=right | 1.0 km || 
|-id=022 bgcolor=#fefefe
| 147022 ||  || — || August 19, 2002 || Palomar || NEAT || FLO || align=right data-sort-value="0.95" | 950 m || 
|-id=023 bgcolor=#fefefe
| 147023 ||  || — || September 4, 2002 || Anderson Mesa || LONEOS || — || align=right | 1.0 km || 
|-id=024 bgcolor=#fefefe
| 147024 ||  || — || September 3, 2002 || Haleakala || NEAT || NYS || align=right | 1.2 km || 
|-id=025 bgcolor=#fefefe
| 147025 ||  || — || September 4, 2002 || Anderson Mesa || LONEOS || NYS || align=right | 1.2 km || 
|-id=026 bgcolor=#fefefe
| 147026 ||  || — || September 4, 2002 || Anderson Mesa || LONEOS || NYS || align=right | 1.0 km || 
|-id=027 bgcolor=#fefefe
| 147027 ||  || — || September 4, 2002 || Anderson Mesa || LONEOS || — || align=right | 1.6 km || 
|-id=028 bgcolor=#fefefe
| 147028 ||  || — || September 4, 2002 || Anderson Mesa || LONEOS || NYS || align=right data-sort-value="0.96" | 960 m || 
|-id=029 bgcolor=#fefefe
| 147029 ||  || — || September 6, 2002 || Socorro || LINEAR || FLO || align=right data-sort-value="0.97" | 970 m || 
|-id=030 bgcolor=#fefefe
| 147030 ||  || — || September 4, 2002 || Anderson Mesa || LONEOS || — || align=right | 1.2 km || 
|-id=031 bgcolor=#fefefe
| 147031 ||  || — || September 4, 2002 || Anderson Mesa || LONEOS || — || align=right | 1.4 km || 
|-id=032 bgcolor=#fefefe
| 147032 ||  || — || September 4, 2002 || Anderson Mesa || LONEOS || FLO || align=right | 1.2 km || 
|-id=033 bgcolor=#fefefe
| 147033 ||  || — || September 5, 2002 || Anderson Mesa || LONEOS || — || align=right | 1.2 km || 
|-id=034 bgcolor=#fefefe
| 147034 ||  || — || September 5, 2002 || Socorro || LINEAR || — || align=right | 1.2 km || 
|-id=035 bgcolor=#fefefe
| 147035 ||  || — || September 5, 2002 || Socorro || LINEAR || — || align=right | 1.2 km || 
|-id=036 bgcolor=#fefefe
| 147036 ||  || — || September 5, 2002 || Socorro || LINEAR || — || align=right | 1.1 km || 
|-id=037 bgcolor=#fefefe
| 147037 ||  || — || September 5, 2002 || Socorro || LINEAR || V || align=right | 1.4 km || 
|-id=038 bgcolor=#fefefe
| 147038 ||  || — || September 5, 2002 || Anderson Mesa || LONEOS || V || align=right | 1.2 km || 
|-id=039 bgcolor=#fefefe
| 147039 ||  || — || September 5, 2002 || Anderson Mesa || LONEOS || — || align=right | 1.6 km || 
|-id=040 bgcolor=#fefefe
| 147040 ||  || — || September 5, 2002 || Socorro || LINEAR || FLO || align=right data-sort-value="0.97" | 970 m || 
|-id=041 bgcolor=#fefefe
| 147041 ||  || — || September 5, 2002 || Socorro || LINEAR || — || align=right | 1.6 km || 
|-id=042 bgcolor=#fefefe
| 147042 ||  || — || September 4, 2002 || Palomar || NEAT || V || align=right data-sort-value="0.66" | 660 m || 
|-id=043 bgcolor=#fefefe
| 147043 ||  || — || September 5, 2002 || Socorro || LINEAR || NYS || align=right | 1.1 km || 
|-id=044 bgcolor=#fefefe
| 147044 ||  || — || September 5, 2002 || Socorro || LINEAR || NYS || align=right data-sort-value="0.92" | 920 m || 
|-id=045 bgcolor=#fefefe
| 147045 ||  || — || September 5, 2002 || Socorro || LINEAR || MAS || align=right | 1.4 km || 
|-id=046 bgcolor=#fefefe
| 147046 ||  || — || September 5, 2002 || Socorro || LINEAR || MAS || align=right | 1.1 km || 
|-id=047 bgcolor=#fefefe
| 147047 ||  || — || September 5, 2002 || Socorro || LINEAR || — || align=right | 1.7 km || 
|-id=048 bgcolor=#fefefe
| 147048 ||  || — || September 5, 2002 || Socorro || LINEAR || V || align=right | 1.1 km || 
|-id=049 bgcolor=#fefefe
| 147049 ||  || — || September 5, 2002 || Socorro || LINEAR || — || align=right | 1.5 km || 
|-id=050 bgcolor=#fefefe
| 147050 ||  || — || September 5, 2002 || Socorro || LINEAR || — || align=right | 1.7 km || 
|-id=051 bgcolor=#fefefe
| 147051 ||  || — || September 5, 2002 || Socorro || LINEAR || — || align=right | 1.4 km || 
|-id=052 bgcolor=#fefefe
| 147052 ||  || — || September 5, 2002 || Socorro || LINEAR || NYS || align=right | 1.5 km || 
|-id=053 bgcolor=#fefefe
| 147053 ||  || — || September 5, 2002 || Socorro || LINEAR || — || align=right | 1.5 km || 
|-id=054 bgcolor=#fefefe
| 147054 ||  || — || September 5, 2002 || Socorro || LINEAR || NYS || align=right | 1.3 km || 
|-id=055 bgcolor=#fefefe
| 147055 ||  || — || September 5, 2002 || Socorro || LINEAR || — || align=right | 1.5 km || 
|-id=056 bgcolor=#fefefe
| 147056 ||  || — || September 5, 2002 || Socorro || LINEAR || MAS || align=right | 1.4 km || 
|-id=057 bgcolor=#FA8072
| 147057 ||  || — || September 5, 2002 || Socorro || LINEAR || — || align=right | 2.4 km || 
|-id=058 bgcolor=#fefefe
| 147058 ||  || — || September 6, 2002 || Socorro || LINEAR || — || align=right | 1.1 km || 
|-id=059 bgcolor=#fefefe
| 147059 ||  || — || September 8, 2002 || Campo Imperatore || CINEOS || — || align=right | 1.8 km || 
|-id=060 bgcolor=#fefefe
| 147060 ||  || — || September 7, 2002 || Socorro || LINEAR || V || align=right | 1.2 km || 
|-id=061 bgcolor=#fefefe
| 147061 ||  || — || September 7, 2002 || Socorro || LINEAR || V || align=right | 1.3 km || 
|-id=062 bgcolor=#fefefe
| 147062 ||  || — || September 8, 2002 || Haleakala || NEAT || — || align=right | 1.6 km || 
|-id=063 bgcolor=#fefefe
| 147063 ||  || — || September 10, 2002 || Palomar || NEAT || V || align=right | 1.4 km || 
|-id=064 bgcolor=#fefefe
| 147064 ||  || — || September 10, 2002 || Haleakala || NEAT || V || align=right | 1.5 km || 
|-id=065 bgcolor=#fefefe
| 147065 ||  || — || September 11, 2002 || Haleakala || NEAT || — || align=right | 1.6 km || 
|-id=066 bgcolor=#fefefe
| 147066 ||  || — || September 13, 2002 || Palomar || NEAT || FLO || align=right | 1.2 km || 
|-id=067 bgcolor=#fefefe
| 147067 ||  || — || September 13, 2002 || Palomar || NEAT || — || align=right | 1.3 km || 
|-id=068 bgcolor=#fefefe
| 147068 ||  || — || September 15, 2002 || Haleakala || NEAT || V || align=right | 1.3 km || 
|-id=069 bgcolor=#fefefe
| 147069 ||  || — || September 13, 2002 || Socorro || LINEAR || V || align=right data-sort-value="0.99" | 990 m || 
|-id=070 bgcolor=#fefefe
| 147070 ||  || — || September 13, 2002 || Palomar || NEAT || V || align=right data-sort-value="0.92" | 920 m || 
|-id=071 bgcolor=#fefefe
| 147071 ||  || — || September 14, 2002 || Haleakala || NEAT || — || align=right | 1.5 km || 
|-id=072 bgcolor=#fefefe
| 147072 ||  || — || September 27, 2002 || Palomar || NEAT || NYS || align=right data-sort-value="0.85" | 850 m || 
|-id=073 bgcolor=#fefefe
| 147073 ||  || — || September 27, 2002 || Palomar || NEAT || NYS || align=right data-sort-value="0.95" | 950 m || 
|-id=074 bgcolor=#fefefe
| 147074 ||  || — || September 27, 2002 || Palomar || NEAT || — || align=right | 1.1 km || 
|-id=075 bgcolor=#fefefe
| 147075 ||  || — || September 28, 2002 || Palomar || NEAT || — || align=right | 1.3 km || 
|-id=076 bgcolor=#fefefe
| 147076 ||  || — || September 26, 2002 || Palomar || NEAT || — || align=right | 1.0 km || 
|-id=077 bgcolor=#fefefe
| 147077 ||  || — || September 28, 2002 || Haleakala || NEAT || V || align=right | 1.3 km || 
|-id=078 bgcolor=#fefefe
| 147078 ||  || — || September 29, 2002 || Haleakala || NEAT || V || align=right | 1.2 km || 
|-id=079 bgcolor=#fefefe
| 147079 ||  || — || September 28, 2002 || Haleakala || NEAT || FLO || align=right | 1.0 km || 
|-id=080 bgcolor=#fefefe
| 147080 ||  || — || September 28, 2002 || Haleakala || NEAT || FLO || align=right | 1.2 km || 
|-id=081 bgcolor=#fefefe
| 147081 ||  || — || September 29, 2002 || Haleakala || NEAT || MAS || align=right | 1.4 km || 
|-id=082 bgcolor=#fefefe
| 147082 ||  || — || September 29, 2002 || Haleakala || NEAT || V || align=right | 1.6 km || 
|-id=083 bgcolor=#FA8072
| 147083 ||  || — || September 29, 2002 || Haleakala || NEAT || — || align=right | 1.3 km || 
|-id=084 bgcolor=#E9E9E9
| 147084 ||  || — || September 29, 2002 || Haleakala || NEAT || — || align=right | 1.3 km || 
|-id=085 bgcolor=#fefefe
| 147085 ||  || — || September 28, 2002 || Haleakala || NEAT || NYS || align=right | 2.3 km || 
|-id=086 bgcolor=#fefefe
| 147086 ||  || — || September 28, 2002 || Haleakala || NEAT || — || align=right | 1.8 km || 
|-id=087 bgcolor=#fefefe
| 147087 ||  || — || September 30, 2002 || Socorro || LINEAR || FLO || align=right | 1.4 km || 
|-id=088 bgcolor=#fefefe
| 147088 ||  || — || September 30, 2002 || Haleakala || NEAT || NYS || align=right | 3.5 km || 
|-id=089 bgcolor=#fefefe
| 147089 ||  || — || September 18, 2002 || Palomar || NEAT || — || align=right | 1.5 km || 
|-id=090 bgcolor=#fefefe
| 147090 ||  || — || September 21, 2002 || Haleakala || NEAT || — || align=right | 1.8 km || 
|-id=091 bgcolor=#fefefe
| 147091 ||  || — || September 30, 2002 || Socorro || LINEAR || V || align=right | 1.3 km || 
|-id=092 bgcolor=#fefefe
| 147092 || 2002 TY || — || October 1, 2002 || Anderson Mesa || LONEOS || — || align=right | 1.4 km || 
|-id=093 bgcolor=#fefefe
| 147093 ||  || — || October 1, 2002 || Anderson Mesa || LONEOS || — || align=right | 1.8 km || 
|-id=094 bgcolor=#E9E9E9
| 147094 ||  || — || October 1, 2002 || Anderson Mesa || LONEOS || — || align=right | 1.3 km || 
|-id=095 bgcolor=#fefefe
| 147095 ||  || — || October 2, 2002 || Socorro || LINEAR || NYS || align=right | 1.2 km || 
|-id=096 bgcolor=#fefefe
| 147096 ||  || — || October 2, 2002 || Socorro || LINEAR || NYS || align=right | 1.3 km || 
|-id=097 bgcolor=#fefefe
| 147097 ||  || — || October 2, 2002 || Socorro || LINEAR || — || align=right | 1.3 km || 
|-id=098 bgcolor=#E9E9E9
| 147098 ||  || — || October 2, 2002 || Socorro || LINEAR || — || align=right | 2.0 km || 
|-id=099 bgcolor=#fefefe
| 147099 ||  || — || October 2, 2002 || Socorro || LINEAR || — || align=right | 1.4 km || 
|-id=100 bgcolor=#fefefe
| 147100 ||  || — || October 2, 2002 || Socorro || LINEAR || NYS || align=right | 1.1 km || 
|}

147101–147200 

|-bgcolor=#fefefe
| 147101 ||  || — || October 2, 2002 || Socorro || LINEAR || NYS || align=right | 1.2 km || 
|-id=102 bgcolor=#fefefe
| 147102 ||  || — || October 2, 2002 || Socorro || LINEAR || MAS || align=right | 1.4 km || 
|-id=103 bgcolor=#fefefe
| 147103 ||  || — || October 2, 2002 || Socorro || LINEAR || — || align=right | 1.6 km || 
|-id=104 bgcolor=#fefefe
| 147104 ||  || — || October 2, 2002 || Socorro || LINEAR || NYS || align=right | 1.2 km || 
|-id=105 bgcolor=#fefefe
| 147105 ||  || — || October 2, 2002 || Socorro || LINEAR || — || align=right | 1.6 km || 
|-id=106 bgcolor=#fefefe
| 147106 ||  || — || October 2, 2002 || Socorro || LINEAR || — || align=right | 2.1 km || 
|-id=107 bgcolor=#fefefe
| 147107 ||  || — || October 2, 2002 || Socorro || LINEAR || — || align=right | 1.8 km || 
|-id=108 bgcolor=#fefefe
| 147108 ||  || — || October 2, 2002 || Socorro || LINEAR || — || align=right | 1.4 km || 
|-id=109 bgcolor=#E9E9E9
| 147109 ||  || — || October 2, 2002 || Socorro || LINEAR || MIT || align=right | 3.2 km || 
|-id=110 bgcolor=#fefefe
| 147110 ||  || — || October 2, 2002 || Socorro || LINEAR || — || align=right | 1.4 km || 
|-id=111 bgcolor=#fefefe
| 147111 ||  || — || October 2, 2002 || Socorro || LINEAR || — || align=right | 1.4 km || 
|-id=112 bgcolor=#fefefe
| 147112 ||  || — || October 2, 2002 || Socorro || LINEAR || — || align=right | 1.6 km || 
|-id=113 bgcolor=#fefefe
| 147113 ||  || — || October 2, 2002 || Campo Imperatore || CINEOS || V || align=right | 1.3 km || 
|-id=114 bgcolor=#fefefe
| 147114 ||  || — || October 3, 2002 || Palomar || NEAT || V || align=right | 1.4 km || 
|-id=115 bgcolor=#fefefe
| 147115 ||  || — || October 3, 2002 || Palomar || NEAT || — || align=right | 1.3 km || 
|-id=116 bgcolor=#fefefe
| 147116 ||  || — || October 1, 2002 || Anderson Mesa || LONEOS || NYS || align=right | 1.00 km || 
|-id=117 bgcolor=#fefefe
| 147117 ||  || — || October 2, 2002 || Haleakala || NEAT || — || align=right | 1.6 km || 
|-id=118 bgcolor=#fefefe
| 147118 ||  || — || October 2, 2002 || Haleakala || NEAT || V || align=right | 1.2 km || 
|-id=119 bgcolor=#fefefe
| 147119 ||  || — || October 3, 2002 || Palomar || NEAT || — || align=right | 1.3 km || 
|-id=120 bgcolor=#fefefe
| 147120 ||  || — || October 2, 2002 || Socorro || LINEAR || EUT || align=right data-sort-value="0.80" | 800 m || 
|-id=121 bgcolor=#fefefe
| 147121 ||  || — || October 3, 2002 || Palomar || NEAT || — || align=right | 2.1 km || 
|-id=122 bgcolor=#fefefe
| 147122 ||  || — || October 4, 2002 || Palomar || NEAT || — || align=right | 1.8 km || 
|-id=123 bgcolor=#fefefe
| 147123 ||  || — || October 4, 2002 || Socorro || LINEAR || — || align=right | 2.2 km || 
|-id=124 bgcolor=#fefefe
| 147124 ||  || — || October 4, 2002 || Palomar || NEAT || — || align=right | 1.4 km || 
|-id=125 bgcolor=#fefefe
| 147125 ||  || — || October 4, 2002 || Socorro || LINEAR || — || align=right | 1.6 km || 
|-id=126 bgcolor=#fefefe
| 147126 ||  || — || October 4, 2002 || Socorro || LINEAR || — || align=right | 1.4 km || 
|-id=127 bgcolor=#fefefe
| 147127 ||  || — || October 4, 2002 || Socorro || LINEAR || — || align=right | 1.9 km || 
|-id=128 bgcolor=#fefefe
| 147128 ||  || — || October 4, 2002 || Anderson Mesa || LONEOS || — || align=right | 1.7 km || 
|-id=129 bgcolor=#fefefe
| 147129 ||  || — || October 4, 2002 || Anderson Mesa || LONEOS || ERI || align=right | 2.8 km || 
|-id=130 bgcolor=#fefefe
| 147130 ||  || — || October 4, 2002 || Socorro || LINEAR || — || align=right | 1.5 km || 
|-id=131 bgcolor=#fefefe
| 147131 ||  || — || October 14, 2002 || Socorro || LINEAR || — || align=right | 3.6 km || 
|-id=132 bgcolor=#fefefe
| 147132 ||  || — || October 4, 2002 || Socorro || LINEAR || FLO || align=right | 1.0 km || 
|-id=133 bgcolor=#fefefe
| 147133 ||  || — || October 4, 2002 || Socorro || LINEAR || — || align=right | 1.2 km || 
|-id=134 bgcolor=#fefefe
| 147134 ||  || — || October 4, 2002 || Socorro || LINEAR || — || align=right | 1.5 km || 
|-id=135 bgcolor=#fefefe
| 147135 ||  || — || October 7, 2002 || Socorro || LINEAR || — || align=right | 1.5 km || 
|-id=136 bgcolor=#fefefe
| 147136 ||  || — || October 8, 2002 || Anderson Mesa || LONEOS || ERI || align=right | 2.4 km || 
|-id=137 bgcolor=#fefefe
| 147137 ||  || — || October 9, 2002 || Socorro || LINEAR || — || align=right | 2.2 km || 
|-id=138 bgcolor=#fefefe
| 147138 ||  || — || October 9, 2002 || Socorro || LINEAR || NYS || align=right | 3.5 km || 
|-id=139 bgcolor=#E9E9E9
| 147139 ||  || — || October 9, 2002 || Socorro || LINEAR || — || align=right | 2.7 km || 
|-id=140 bgcolor=#fefefe
| 147140 ||  || — || October 9, 2002 || Anderson Mesa || LONEOS || V || align=right | 1.2 km || 
|-id=141 bgcolor=#fefefe
| 147141 ||  || — || October 9, 2002 || Anderson Mesa || LONEOS || V || align=right | 1.1 km || 
|-id=142 bgcolor=#fefefe
| 147142 ||  || — || October 9, 2002 || Kitt Peak || Spacewatch || — || align=right | 1.5 km || 
|-id=143 bgcolor=#E9E9E9
| 147143 ||  || — || October 8, 2002 || Anderson Mesa || LONEOS || — || align=right | 2.5 km || 
|-id=144 bgcolor=#fefefe
| 147144 ||  || — || October 9, 2002 || Socorro || LINEAR || NYS || align=right | 1.0 km || 
|-id=145 bgcolor=#fefefe
| 147145 ||  || — || October 9, 2002 || Socorro || LINEAR || FLO || align=right | 1.2 km || 
|-id=146 bgcolor=#fefefe
| 147146 ||  || — || October 9, 2002 || Socorro || LINEAR || — || align=right | 1.7 km || 
|-id=147 bgcolor=#fefefe
| 147147 ||  || — || October 9, 2002 || Socorro || LINEAR || — || align=right | 3.3 km || 
|-id=148 bgcolor=#fefefe
| 147148 ||  || — || October 9, 2002 || Socorro || LINEAR || NYS || align=right | 1.8 km || 
|-id=149 bgcolor=#fefefe
| 147149 ||  || — || October 10, 2002 || Socorro || LINEAR || V || align=right | 1.1 km || 
|-id=150 bgcolor=#fefefe
| 147150 ||  || — || October 10, 2002 || Socorro || LINEAR || — || align=right | 1.9 km || 
|-id=151 bgcolor=#fefefe
| 147151 ||  || — || October 11, 2002 || Socorro || LINEAR || — || align=right | 1.1 km || 
|-id=152 bgcolor=#fefefe
| 147152 ||  || — || October 12, 2002 || Socorro || LINEAR || V || align=right | 1.3 km || 
|-id=153 bgcolor=#fefefe
| 147153 ||  || — || October 11, 2002 || Socorro || LINEAR || NYS || align=right data-sort-value="0.96" | 960 m || 
|-id=154 bgcolor=#fefefe
| 147154 ||  || — || October 28, 2002 || Palomar || NEAT || — || align=right | 1.8 km || 
|-id=155 bgcolor=#fefefe
| 147155 ||  || — || October 28, 2002 || Socorro || LINEAR || — || align=right | 1.7 km || 
|-id=156 bgcolor=#fefefe
| 147156 ||  || — || October 28, 2002 || Haleakala || NEAT || — || align=right | 1.5 km || 
|-id=157 bgcolor=#fefefe
| 147157 ||  || — || October 28, 2002 || Haleakala || NEAT || — || align=right | 1.6 km || 
|-id=158 bgcolor=#fefefe
| 147158 ||  || — || October 30, 2002 || Haleakala || NEAT || — || align=right | 1.3 km || 
|-id=159 bgcolor=#fefefe
| 147159 ||  || — || October 30, 2002 || Haleakala || NEAT || — || align=right | 1.2 km || 
|-id=160 bgcolor=#E9E9E9
| 147160 ||  || — || October 30, 2002 || Haleakala || NEAT || — || align=right | 3.1 km || 
|-id=161 bgcolor=#fefefe
| 147161 ||  || — || November 1, 2002 || Palomar || NEAT || — || align=right | 2.8 km || 
|-id=162 bgcolor=#fefefe
| 147162 ||  || — || November 1, 2002 || Palomar || NEAT || — || align=right | 1.7 km || 
|-id=163 bgcolor=#fefefe
| 147163 ||  || — || November 1, 2002 || Palomar || NEAT || — || align=right | 1.8 km || 
|-id=164 bgcolor=#fefefe
| 147164 ||  || — || November 1, 2002 || Palomar || NEAT || V || align=right | 1.5 km || 
|-id=165 bgcolor=#fefefe
| 147165 ||  || — || November 1, 2002 || Haleakala || NEAT || — || align=right | 1.5 km || 
|-id=166 bgcolor=#fefefe
| 147166 ||  || — || November 2, 2002 || Palomar || NEAT || — || align=right | 1.8 km || 
|-id=167 bgcolor=#fefefe
| 147167 ||  || — || November 5, 2002 || Socorro || LINEAR || — || align=right | 1.3 km || 
|-id=168 bgcolor=#fefefe
| 147168 ||  || — || November 4, 2002 || Palomar || NEAT || NYS || align=right | 1.2 km || 
|-id=169 bgcolor=#fefefe
| 147169 ||  || — || November 5, 2002 || Socorro || LINEAR || — || align=right | 3.2 km || 
|-id=170 bgcolor=#fefefe
| 147170 ||  || — || November 5, 2002 || Socorro || LINEAR || EUT || align=right | 1.1 km || 
|-id=171 bgcolor=#fefefe
| 147171 ||  || — || November 5, 2002 || Anderson Mesa || LONEOS || — || align=right | 1.6 km || 
|-id=172 bgcolor=#fefefe
| 147172 ||  || — || November 5, 2002 || Socorro || LINEAR || V || align=right | 1.3 km || 
|-id=173 bgcolor=#fefefe
| 147173 ||  || — || November 5, 2002 || Socorro || LINEAR || — || align=right | 2.0 km || 
|-id=174 bgcolor=#E9E9E9
| 147174 ||  || — || November 5, 2002 || Socorro || LINEAR || MIT || align=right | 4.2 km || 
|-id=175 bgcolor=#E9E9E9
| 147175 ||  || — || November 5, 2002 || Anderson Mesa || LONEOS || — || align=right | 2.4 km || 
|-id=176 bgcolor=#fefefe
| 147176 ||  || — || November 4, 2002 || Palomar || NEAT || ERI || align=right | 3.3 km || 
|-id=177 bgcolor=#fefefe
| 147177 ||  || — || November 5, 2002 || Socorro || LINEAR || — || align=right | 1.6 km || 
|-id=178 bgcolor=#fefefe
| 147178 ||  || — || November 5, 2002 || Anderson Mesa || LONEOS || NYS || align=right | 1.1 km || 
|-id=179 bgcolor=#fefefe
| 147179 ||  || — || November 5, 2002 || Anderson Mesa || LONEOS || — || align=right | 1.7 km || 
|-id=180 bgcolor=#fefefe
| 147180 ||  || — || November 6, 2002 || Socorro || LINEAR || — || align=right | 1.3 km || 
|-id=181 bgcolor=#fefefe
| 147181 ||  || — || November 3, 2002 || Haleakala || NEAT || — || align=right | 1.7 km || 
|-id=182 bgcolor=#fefefe
| 147182 ||  || — || November 5, 2002 || Socorro || LINEAR || NYS || align=right | 1.5 km || 
|-id=183 bgcolor=#fefefe
| 147183 ||  || — || November 8, 2002 || Socorro || LINEAR || — || align=right | 1.4 km || 
|-id=184 bgcolor=#fefefe
| 147184 ||  || — || November 7, 2002 || Socorro || LINEAR || — || align=right | 1.5 km || 
|-id=185 bgcolor=#fefefe
| 147185 ||  || — || November 7, 2002 || Socorro || LINEAR || — || align=right | 2.2 km || 
|-id=186 bgcolor=#fefefe
| 147186 ||  || — || November 7, 2002 || Socorro || LINEAR || — || align=right | 1.3 km || 
|-id=187 bgcolor=#fefefe
| 147187 ||  || — || November 7, 2002 || Socorro || LINEAR || — || align=right | 1.2 km || 
|-id=188 bgcolor=#fefefe
| 147188 ||  || — || November 7, 2002 || Socorro || LINEAR || NYS || align=right | 1.2 km || 
|-id=189 bgcolor=#fefefe
| 147189 ||  || — || November 7, 2002 || Socorro || LINEAR || — || align=right | 1.8 km || 
|-id=190 bgcolor=#fefefe
| 147190 ||  || — || November 8, 2002 || Socorro || LINEAR || NYS || align=right | 1.1 km || 
|-id=191 bgcolor=#E9E9E9
| 147191 ||  || — || November 11, 2002 || Socorro || LINEAR || — || align=right | 1.8 km || 
|-id=192 bgcolor=#fefefe
| 147192 ||  || — || November 11, 2002 || Anderson Mesa || LONEOS || V || align=right | 1.1 km || 
|-id=193 bgcolor=#fefefe
| 147193 ||  || — || November 11, 2002 || Anderson Mesa || LONEOS || — || align=right | 1.9 km || 
|-id=194 bgcolor=#fefefe
| 147194 ||  || — || November 8, 2002 || Socorro || LINEAR || — || align=right | 1.6 km || 
|-id=195 bgcolor=#fefefe
| 147195 ||  || — || November 11, 2002 || Socorro || LINEAR || — || align=right | 1.5 km || 
|-id=196 bgcolor=#E9E9E9
| 147196 ||  || — || November 11, 2002 || Socorro || LINEAR || — || align=right | 1.6 km || 
|-id=197 bgcolor=#fefefe
| 147197 ||  || — || November 12, 2002 || Socorro || LINEAR || NYS || align=right | 1.0 km || 
|-id=198 bgcolor=#fefefe
| 147198 ||  || — || November 12, 2002 || Socorro || LINEAR || — || align=right | 1.5 km || 
|-id=199 bgcolor=#fefefe
| 147199 ||  || — || November 12, 2002 || Socorro || LINEAR || — || align=right | 2.2 km || 
|-id=200 bgcolor=#E9E9E9
| 147200 ||  || — || November 12, 2002 || Socorro || LINEAR || — || align=right | 4.0 km || 
|}

147201–147300 

|-bgcolor=#fefefe
| 147201 ||  || — || November 13, 2002 || Palomar || NEAT || NYS || align=right | 1.1 km || 
|-id=202 bgcolor=#fefefe
| 147202 ||  || — || November 12, 2002 || Socorro || LINEAR || V || align=right | 1.3 km || 
|-id=203 bgcolor=#fefefe
| 147203 ||  || — || November 12, 2002 || Palomar || NEAT || V || align=right | 1.1 km || 
|-id=204 bgcolor=#fefefe
| 147204 ||  || — || November 12, 2002 || Socorro || LINEAR || V || align=right | 1.2 km || 
|-id=205 bgcolor=#fefefe
| 147205 ||  || — || November 6, 2002 || Anderson Mesa || LONEOS || — || align=right | 3.0 km || 
|-id=206 bgcolor=#E9E9E9
| 147206 ||  || — || November 6, 2002 || Socorro || LINEAR || — || align=right | 3.1 km || 
|-id=207 bgcolor=#E9E9E9
| 147207 ||  || — || November 6, 2002 || Palomar || NEAT || — || align=right | 1.4 km || 
|-id=208 bgcolor=#E9E9E9
| 147208 || 2002 WE || — || November 18, 2002 || Palomar || NEAT || — || align=right | 3.7 km || 
|-id=209 bgcolor=#fefefe
| 147209 ||  || — || November 24, 2002 || Palomar || NEAT || NYS || align=right | 1.2 km || 
|-id=210 bgcolor=#fefefe
| 147210 ||  || — || November 24, 2002 || Palomar || NEAT || — || align=right | 1.6 km || 
|-id=211 bgcolor=#fefefe
| 147211 ||  || — || November 24, 2002 || Palomar || NEAT || — || align=right | 1.3 km || 
|-id=212 bgcolor=#fefefe
| 147212 ||  || — || November 25, 2002 || Palomar || NEAT || MAS || align=right | 1.2 km || 
|-id=213 bgcolor=#fefefe
| 147213 ||  || — || November 28, 2002 || Anderson Mesa || LONEOS || V || align=right | 1.3 km || 
|-id=214 bgcolor=#E9E9E9
| 147214 ||  || — || November 28, 2002 || Anderson Mesa || LONEOS || — || align=right | 1.5 km || 
|-id=215 bgcolor=#fefefe
| 147215 ||  || — || November 30, 2002 || Haleakala || NEAT || PHO || align=right | 2.2 km || 
|-id=216 bgcolor=#fefefe
| 147216 ||  || — || December 1, 2002 || Socorro || LINEAR || V || align=right | 1.3 km || 
|-id=217 bgcolor=#E9E9E9
| 147217 ||  || — || December 2, 2002 || Socorro || LINEAR || — || align=right | 1.8 km || 
|-id=218 bgcolor=#fefefe
| 147218 ||  || — || December 3, 2002 || Palomar || NEAT || NYS || align=right data-sort-value="0.93" | 930 m || 
|-id=219 bgcolor=#E9E9E9
| 147219 ||  || — || December 3, 2002 || Palomar || NEAT || — || align=right | 1.7 km || 
|-id=220 bgcolor=#fefefe
| 147220 ||  || — || December 7, 2002 || Desert Eagle || W. K. Y. Yeung || — || align=right | 1.2 km || 
|-id=221 bgcolor=#E9E9E9
| 147221 ||  || — || December 5, 2002 || Socorro || LINEAR || — || align=right | 1.6 km || 
|-id=222 bgcolor=#E9E9E9
| 147222 ||  || — || December 5, 2002 || Socorro || LINEAR || — || align=right | 2.2 km || 
|-id=223 bgcolor=#E9E9E9
| 147223 ||  || — || December 5, 2002 || Socorro || LINEAR || — || align=right | 2.1 km || 
|-id=224 bgcolor=#fefefe
| 147224 ||  || — || December 6, 2002 || Socorro || LINEAR || — || align=right | 1.8 km || 
|-id=225 bgcolor=#fefefe
| 147225 ||  || — || December 6, 2002 || Socorro || LINEAR || — || align=right | 2.0 km || 
|-id=226 bgcolor=#fefefe
| 147226 ||  || — || December 6, 2002 || Socorro || LINEAR || — || align=right | 1.5 km || 
|-id=227 bgcolor=#fefefe
| 147227 ||  || — || December 5, 2002 || Socorro || LINEAR || V || align=right | 1.4 km || 
|-id=228 bgcolor=#fefefe
| 147228 ||  || — || December 8, 2002 || Desert Eagle || W. K. Y. Yeung || NYS || align=right | 1.2 km || 
|-id=229 bgcolor=#E9E9E9
| 147229 ||  || — || December 9, 2002 || Kitt Peak || Spacewatch || — || align=right | 2.2 km || 
|-id=230 bgcolor=#fefefe
| 147230 ||  || — || December 6, 2002 || Socorro || LINEAR || V || align=right | 1.5 km || 
|-id=231 bgcolor=#fefefe
| 147231 ||  || — || December 10, 2002 || Socorro || LINEAR || V || align=right | 1.3 km || 
|-id=232 bgcolor=#fefefe
| 147232 ||  || — || December 10, 2002 || Socorro || LINEAR || — || align=right | 1.5 km || 
|-id=233 bgcolor=#E9E9E9
| 147233 ||  || — || December 10, 2002 || Socorro || LINEAR || — || align=right | 2.0 km || 
|-id=234 bgcolor=#E9E9E9
| 147234 ||  || — || December 10, 2002 || Palomar || NEAT || MAR || align=right | 2.0 km || 
|-id=235 bgcolor=#E9E9E9
| 147235 ||  || — || December 10, 2002 || Socorro || LINEAR || — || align=right | 1.7 km || 
|-id=236 bgcolor=#E9E9E9
| 147236 ||  || — || December 10, 2002 || Socorro || LINEAR || — || align=right | 1.8 km || 
|-id=237 bgcolor=#E9E9E9
| 147237 ||  || — || December 10, 2002 || Socorro || LINEAR || — || align=right | 2.9 km || 
|-id=238 bgcolor=#E9E9E9
| 147238 ||  || — || December 10, 2002 || Palomar || NEAT || — || align=right | 2.2 km || 
|-id=239 bgcolor=#E9E9E9
| 147239 ||  || — || December 11, 2002 || Socorro || LINEAR || JUN || align=right | 2.5 km || 
|-id=240 bgcolor=#fefefe
| 147240 ||  || — || December 10, 2002 || Socorro || LINEAR || NYS || align=right | 1.0 km || 
|-id=241 bgcolor=#fefefe
| 147241 ||  || — || December 11, 2002 || Socorro || LINEAR || SULslow || align=right | 4.1 km || 
|-id=242 bgcolor=#E9E9E9
| 147242 ||  || — || December 11, 2002 || Socorro || LINEAR || — || align=right | 1.9 km || 
|-id=243 bgcolor=#E9E9E9
| 147243 ||  || — || December 10, 2002 || Socorro || LINEAR || — || align=right | 1.8 km || 
|-id=244 bgcolor=#fefefe
| 147244 ||  || — || December 11, 2002 || Socorro || LINEAR || — || align=right | 1.7 km || 
|-id=245 bgcolor=#E9E9E9
| 147245 ||  || — || December 11, 2002 || Socorro || LINEAR || — || align=right | 2.1 km || 
|-id=246 bgcolor=#E9E9E9
| 147246 ||  || — || December 11, 2002 || Socorro || LINEAR || RAF || align=right | 1.8 km || 
|-id=247 bgcolor=#E9E9E9
| 147247 ||  || — || December 11, 2002 || Socorro || LINEAR || — || align=right | 2.5 km || 
|-id=248 bgcolor=#E9E9E9
| 147248 ||  || — || December 11, 2002 || Socorro || LINEAR || — || align=right | 4.3 km || 
|-id=249 bgcolor=#fefefe
| 147249 ||  || — || December 11, 2002 || Socorro || LINEAR || — || align=right | 3.7 km || 
|-id=250 bgcolor=#E9E9E9
| 147250 ||  || — || December 11, 2002 || Palomar || NEAT || — || align=right | 2.9 km || 
|-id=251 bgcolor=#E9E9E9
| 147251 ||  || — || December 11, 2002 || Socorro || LINEAR || — || align=right | 2.4 km || 
|-id=252 bgcolor=#E9E9E9
| 147252 ||  || — || December 11, 2002 || Socorro || LINEAR || MAR || align=right | 1.7 km || 
|-id=253 bgcolor=#E9E9E9
| 147253 ||  || — || December 11, 2002 || Socorro || LINEAR || RAF || align=right | 1.8 km || 
|-id=254 bgcolor=#E9E9E9
| 147254 ||  || — || December 11, 2002 || Socorro || LINEAR || ADE || align=right | 3.7 km || 
|-id=255 bgcolor=#E9E9E9
| 147255 ||  || — || December 14, 2002 || Socorro || LINEAR || — || align=right | 3.7 km || 
|-id=256 bgcolor=#E9E9E9
| 147256 ||  || — || December 4, 2002 || Kitt Peak || M. W. Buie || — || align=right | 2.2 km || 
|-id=257 bgcolor=#fefefe
| 147257 ||  || — || December 4, 2002 || Kitt Peak || M. W. Buie || — || align=right | 1.6 km || 
|-id=258 bgcolor=#fefefe
| 147258 ||  || — || December 5, 2002 || Socorro || LINEAR || NYS || align=right | 1.8 km || 
|-id=259 bgcolor=#E9E9E9
| 147259 ||  || — || December 6, 2002 || Socorro || LINEAR || — || align=right | 1.7 km || 
|-id=260 bgcolor=#E9E9E9
| 147260 ||  || — || December 6, 2002 || Socorro || LINEAR || — || align=right | 2.2 km || 
|-id=261 bgcolor=#E9E9E9
| 147261 || 2002 YQ || — || December 27, 2002 || Anderson Mesa || LONEOS || — || align=right | 1.9 km || 
|-id=262 bgcolor=#E9E9E9
| 147262 || 2002 YV || — || December 27, 2002 || Anderson Mesa || LONEOS || — || align=right | 1.8 km || 
|-id=263 bgcolor=#E9E9E9
| 147263 ||  || — || December 28, 2002 || Kitt Peak || Spacewatch || ADE || align=right | 5.0 km || 
|-id=264 bgcolor=#fefefe
| 147264 ||  || — || December 31, 2002 || Socorro || LINEAR || — || align=right | 1.8 km || 
|-id=265 bgcolor=#E9E9E9
| 147265 ||  || — || December 31, 2002 || Socorro || LINEAR || — || align=right | 2.1 km || 
|-id=266 bgcolor=#E9E9E9
| 147266 ||  || — || December 31, 2002 || Socorro || LINEAR || — || align=right | 2.1 km || 
|-id=267 bgcolor=#E9E9E9
| 147267 ||  || — || December 31, 2002 || Socorro || LINEAR || — || align=right | 3.5 km || 
|-id=268 bgcolor=#E9E9E9
| 147268 ||  || — || December 31, 2002 || Socorro || LINEAR || — || align=right | 1.5 km || 
|-id=269 bgcolor=#fefefe
| 147269 ||  || — || December 31, 2002 || Socorro || LINEAR || — || align=right | 1.6 km || 
|-id=270 bgcolor=#fefefe
| 147270 ||  || — || December 31, 2002 || Socorro || LINEAR || NYS || align=right | 1.5 km || 
|-id=271 bgcolor=#E9E9E9
| 147271 ||  || — || December 31, 2002 || Socorro || LINEAR || — || align=right | 1.8 km || 
|-id=272 bgcolor=#fefefe
| 147272 ||  || — || December 31, 2002 || Socorro || LINEAR || — || align=right | 2.4 km || 
|-id=273 bgcolor=#E9E9E9
| 147273 ||  || — || December 31, 2002 || Socorro || LINEAR || EUN || align=right | 2.3 km || 
|-id=274 bgcolor=#E9E9E9
| 147274 ||  || — || December 31, 2002 || Socorro || LINEAR || — || align=right | 2.3 km || 
|-id=275 bgcolor=#fefefe
| 147275 ||  || — || December 31, 2002 || Socorro || LINEAR || NYS || align=right | 3.4 km || 
|-id=276 bgcolor=#fefefe
| 147276 ||  || — || December 31, 2002 || Socorro || LINEAR || EUT || align=right | 1.2 km || 
|-id=277 bgcolor=#fefefe
| 147277 ||  || — || December 31, 2002 || Socorro || LINEAR || — || align=right | 2.0 km || 
|-id=278 bgcolor=#E9E9E9
| 147278 ||  || — || December 31, 2002 || Socorro || LINEAR || — || align=right | 3.4 km || 
|-id=279 bgcolor=#E9E9E9
| 147279 ||  || — || December 30, 2002 || Haleakala || NEAT || JUN || align=right | 4.6 km || 
|-id=280 bgcolor=#E9E9E9
| 147280 ||  || — || December 30, 2002 || Socorro || LINEAR || — || align=right | 3.9 km || 
|-id=281 bgcolor=#E9E9E9
| 147281 ||  || — || December 31, 2002 || Socorro || LINEAR || — || align=right | 3.2 km || 
|-id=282 bgcolor=#E9E9E9
| 147282 ||  || — || January 1, 2003 || Socorro || LINEAR || — || align=right | 2.3 km || 
|-id=283 bgcolor=#E9E9E9
| 147283 ||  || — || January 1, 2003 || Socorro || LINEAR || — || align=right | 3.5 km || 
|-id=284 bgcolor=#E9E9E9
| 147284 ||  || — || January 7, 2003 || Socorro || LINEAR || — || align=right | 6.0 km || 
|-id=285 bgcolor=#E9E9E9
| 147285 ||  || — || January 4, 2003 || Socorro || LINEAR || — || align=right | 1.5 km || 
|-id=286 bgcolor=#E9E9E9
| 147286 ||  || — || January 4, 2003 || Socorro || LINEAR || — || align=right | 1.8 km || 
|-id=287 bgcolor=#fefefe
| 147287 ||  || — || January 4, 2003 || Socorro || LINEAR || NYS || align=right | 1.2 km || 
|-id=288 bgcolor=#E9E9E9
| 147288 ||  || — || January 5, 2003 || Socorro || LINEAR || — || align=right | 2.4 km || 
|-id=289 bgcolor=#E9E9E9
| 147289 ||  || — || January 7, 2003 || Socorro || LINEAR || — || align=right | 2.8 km || 
|-id=290 bgcolor=#E9E9E9
| 147290 ||  || — || January 7, 2003 || Socorro || LINEAR || — || align=right | 2.1 km || 
|-id=291 bgcolor=#E9E9E9
| 147291 ||  || — || January 7, 2003 || Socorro || LINEAR || RAF || align=right | 1.6 km || 
|-id=292 bgcolor=#E9E9E9
| 147292 ||  || — || January 7, 2003 || Socorro || LINEAR || GEF || align=right | 2.0 km || 
|-id=293 bgcolor=#d6d6d6
| 147293 ||  || — || January 7, 2003 || Haleakala || NEAT || BRA || align=right | 4.0 km || 
|-id=294 bgcolor=#E9E9E9
| 147294 ||  || — || January 5, 2003 || Socorro || LINEAR || — || align=right | 1.8 km || 
|-id=295 bgcolor=#E9E9E9
| 147295 ||  || — || January 5, 2003 || Socorro || LINEAR || — || align=right | 3.0 km || 
|-id=296 bgcolor=#E9E9E9
| 147296 ||  || — || January 5, 2003 || Socorro || LINEAR || — || align=right | 1.7 km || 
|-id=297 bgcolor=#E9E9E9
| 147297 ||  || — || January 5, 2003 || Socorro || LINEAR || — || align=right | 3.0 km || 
|-id=298 bgcolor=#fefefe
| 147298 ||  || — || January 5, 2003 || Socorro || LINEAR || NYS || align=right | 1.7 km || 
|-id=299 bgcolor=#E9E9E9
| 147299 ||  || — || January 5, 2003 || Socorro || LINEAR || — || align=right | 3.1 km || 
|-id=300 bgcolor=#E9E9E9
| 147300 ||  || — || January 5, 2003 || Socorro || LINEAR || — || align=right | 2.8 km || 
|}

147301–147400 

|-bgcolor=#E9E9E9
| 147301 ||  || — || January 7, 2003 || Socorro || LINEAR || — || align=right | 2.6 km || 
|-id=302 bgcolor=#fefefe
| 147302 ||  || — || January 8, 2003 || Socorro || LINEAR || NYS || align=right | 1.5 km || 
|-id=303 bgcolor=#E9E9E9
| 147303 ||  || — || January 7, 2003 || Socorro || LINEAR || — || align=right | 2.5 km || 
|-id=304 bgcolor=#E9E9E9
| 147304 ||  || — || January 8, 2003 || Socorro || LINEAR || — || align=right | 2.1 km || 
|-id=305 bgcolor=#E9E9E9
| 147305 ||  || — || January 11, 2003 || Socorro || LINEAR || — || align=right | 2.4 km || 
|-id=306 bgcolor=#E9E9E9
| 147306 ||  || — || January 11, 2003 || Socorro || LINEAR || — || align=right | 2.3 km || 
|-id=307 bgcolor=#E9E9E9
| 147307 ||  || — || January 10, 2003 || Socorro || LINEAR || EUN || align=right | 3.0 km || 
|-id=308 bgcolor=#E9E9E9
| 147308 ||  || — || January 10, 2003 || Kitt Peak || Spacewatch || JUN || align=right | 2.0 km || 
|-id=309 bgcolor=#E9E9E9
| 147309 ||  || — || January 2, 2003 || Socorro || LINEAR || — || align=right | 3.6 km || 
|-id=310 bgcolor=#E9E9E9
| 147310 ||  || — || January 2, 2003 || Socorro || LINEAR || JUN || align=right | 2.6 km || 
|-id=311 bgcolor=#E9E9E9
| 147311 ||  || — || January 4, 2003 || Socorro || LINEAR || IAN || align=right | 1.4 km || 
|-id=312 bgcolor=#E9E9E9
| 147312 ||  || — || January 4, 2003 || Socorro || LINEAR || HNS || align=right | 2.2 km || 
|-id=313 bgcolor=#E9E9E9
| 147313 ||  || — || January 2, 2003 || Socorro || LINEAR || ADE || align=right | 4.9 km || 
|-id=314 bgcolor=#d6d6d6
| 147314 ||  || — || January 1, 2003 || Kitt Peak || Spacewatch || — || align=right | 5.1 km || 
|-id=315 bgcolor=#E9E9E9
| 147315 ||  || — || January 25, 2003 || Palomar || NEAT || GEF || align=right | 2.1 km || 
|-id=316 bgcolor=#fefefe
| 147316 ||  || — || January 23, 2003 || Kvistaberg || UDAS || — || align=right | 1.8 km || 
|-id=317 bgcolor=#E9E9E9
| 147317 ||  || — || January 25, 2003 || Anderson Mesa || LONEOS || — || align=right | 3.5 km || 
|-id=318 bgcolor=#E9E9E9
| 147318 ||  || — || January 26, 2003 || Anderson Mesa || LONEOS || — || align=right | 1.6 km || 
|-id=319 bgcolor=#E9E9E9
| 147319 ||  || — || January 26, 2003 || Anderson Mesa || LONEOS || — || align=right | 1.6 km || 
|-id=320 bgcolor=#E9E9E9
| 147320 ||  || — || January 26, 2003 || Anderson Mesa || LONEOS || — || align=right | 1.6 km || 
|-id=321 bgcolor=#E9E9E9
| 147321 ||  || — || January 26, 2003 || Haleakala || NEAT || — || align=right | 1.9 km || 
|-id=322 bgcolor=#fefefe
| 147322 ||  || — || January 26, 2003 || Haleakala || NEAT || — || align=right | 1.7 km || 
|-id=323 bgcolor=#E9E9E9
| 147323 ||  || — || January 26, 2003 || Haleakala || NEAT || — || align=right | 2.0 km || 
|-id=324 bgcolor=#fefefe
| 147324 ||  || — || January 26, 2003 || Haleakala || NEAT || — || align=right | 4.1 km || 
|-id=325 bgcolor=#E9E9E9
| 147325 ||  || — || January 27, 2003 || Socorro || LINEAR || — || align=right | 1.5 km || 
|-id=326 bgcolor=#E9E9E9
| 147326 ||  || — || January 25, 2003 || Palomar || NEAT || GEF || align=right | 2.2 km || 
|-id=327 bgcolor=#E9E9E9
| 147327 ||  || — || January 27, 2003 || Socorro || LINEAR || — || align=right | 2.2 km || 
|-id=328 bgcolor=#E9E9E9
| 147328 ||  || — || January 27, 2003 || Socorro || LINEAR || GEF || align=right | 1.8 km || 
|-id=329 bgcolor=#E9E9E9
| 147329 ||  || — || January 27, 2003 || Haleakala || NEAT || — || align=right | 2.0 km || 
|-id=330 bgcolor=#E9E9E9
| 147330 ||  || — || January 27, 2003 || Haleakala || NEAT || ADE || align=right | 3.6 km || 
|-id=331 bgcolor=#E9E9E9
| 147331 ||  || — || January 27, 2003 || Socorro || LINEAR || — || align=right | 3.5 km || 
|-id=332 bgcolor=#E9E9E9
| 147332 ||  || — || January 27, 2003 || Kitt Peak || Spacewatch || — || align=right | 2.0 km || 
|-id=333 bgcolor=#E9E9E9
| 147333 ||  || — || January 28, 2003 || Socorro || LINEAR || — || align=right | 4.6 km || 
|-id=334 bgcolor=#E9E9E9
| 147334 ||  || — || January 26, 2003 || Haleakala || NEAT || — || align=right | 2.1 km || 
|-id=335 bgcolor=#E9E9E9
| 147335 ||  || — || January 27, 2003 || Anderson Mesa || LONEOS || — || align=right | 2.0 km || 
|-id=336 bgcolor=#fefefe
| 147336 ||  || — || January 27, 2003 || Socorro || LINEAR || NYS || align=right | 1.5 km || 
|-id=337 bgcolor=#E9E9E9
| 147337 ||  || — || January 27, 2003 || Socorro || LINEAR || — || align=right | 1.6 km || 
|-id=338 bgcolor=#E9E9E9
| 147338 ||  || — || January 27, 2003 || Palomar || NEAT || — || align=right | 2.7 km || 
|-id=339 bgcolor=#fefefe
| 147339 ||  || — || January 27, 2003 || Socorro || LINEAR || V || align=right | 1.2 km || 
|-id=340 bgcolor=#E9E9E9
| 147340 ||  || — || January 27, 2003 || Socorro || LINEAR || — || align=right | 2.0 km || 
|-id=341 bgcolor=#E9E9E9
| 147341 ||  || — || January 27, 2003 || Socorro || LINEAR || — || align=right | 3.9 km || 
|-id=342 bgcolor=#E9E9E9
| 147342 ||  || — || January 30, 2003 || Kitt Peak || Spacewatch || WIT || align=right | 1.6 km || 
|-id=343 bgcolor=#fefefe
| 147343 ||  || — || January 30, 2003 || Kitt Peak || Spacewatch || MAS || align=right | 1.5 km || 
|-id=344 bgcolor=#E9E9E9
| 147344 ||  || — || January 30, 2003 || Haleakala || NEAT || — || align=right | 2.7 km || 
|-id=345 bgcolor=#d6d6d6
| 147345 ||  || — || January 29, 2003 || Kitt Peak || Spacewatch || — || align=right | 4.8 km || 
|-id=346 bgcolor=#E9E9E9
| 147346 ||  || — || January 31, 2003 || Socorro || LINEAR || — || align=right | 3.7 km || 
|-id=347 bgcolor=#E9E9E9
| 147347 ||  || — || January 31, 2003 || Socorro || LINEAR || — || align=right | 2.0 km || 
|-id=348 bgcolor=#E9E9E9
| 147348 ||  || — || January 28, 2003 || Socorro || LINEAR || ADE || align=right | 3.6 km || 
|-id=349 bgcolor=#E9E9E9
| 147349 ||  || — || January 28, 2003 || Palomar || NEAT || — || align=right | 1.8 km || 
|-id=350 bgcolor=#E9E9E9
| 147350 ||  || — || January 30, 2003 || Haleakala || NEAT || — || align=right | 3.3 km || 
|-id=351 bgcolor=#fefefe
| 147351 ||  || — || January 31, 2003 || Socorro || LINEAR || — || align=right | 2.0 km || 
|-id=352 bgcolor=#fefefe
| 147352 ||  || — || January 31, 2003 || Socorro || LINEAR || — || align=right | 1.5 km || 
|-id=353 bgcolor=#E9E9E9
| 147353 ||  || — || January 31, 2003 || Socorro || LINEAR || MIT || align=right | 4.9 km || 
|-id=354 bgcolor=#E9E9E9
| 147354 ||  || — || January 31, 2003 || Socorro || LINEAR || — || align=right | 2.7 km || 
|-id=355 bgcolor=#E9E9E9
| 147355 ||  || — || January 31, 2003 || Socorro || LINEAR || NEM || align=right | 4.2 km || 
|-id=356 bgcolor=#E9E9E9
| 147356 ||  || — || January 26, 2003 || Socorro || LINEAR || — || align=right | 5.1 km || 
|-id=357 bgcolor=#E9E9E9
| 147357 ||  || — || February 1, 2003 || Socorro || LINEAR || — || align=right | 1.6 km || 
|-id=358 bgcolor=#E9E9E9
| 147358 ||  || — || February 2, 2003 || Socorro || LINEAR || INO || align=right | 1.9 km || 
|-id=359 bgcolor=#E9E9E9
| 147359 ||  || — || February 1, 2003 || Socorro || LINEAR || — || align=right | 4.6 km || 
|-id=360 bgcolor=#E9E9E9
| 147360 ||  || — || February 2, 2003 || Anderson Mesa || LONEOS || — || align=right | 4.1 km || 
|-id=361 bgcolor=#E9E9E9
| 147361 ||  || — || February 2, 2003 || Socorro || LINEAR || MRX || align=right | 2.3 km || 
|-id=362 bgcolor=#E9E9E9
| 147362 ||  || — || February 2, 2003 || Socorro || LINEAR || MRX || align=right | 1.8 km || 
|-id=363 bgcolor=#E9E9E9
| 147363 ||  || — || February 2, 2003 || Socorro || LINEAR || DOR || align=right | 5.8 km || 
|-id=364 bgcolor=#E9E9E9
| 147364 ||  || — || February 2, 2003 || Socorro || LINEAR || — || align=right | 2.5 km || 
|-id=365 bgcolor=#E9E9E9
| 147365 ||  || — || February 3, 2003 || Haleakala || NEAT || — || align=right | 1.8 km || 
|-id=366 bgcolor=#E9E9E9
| 147366 ||  || — || February 8, 2003 || Anderson Mesa || LONEOS || EUN || align=right | 2.3 km || 
|-id=367 bgcolor=#E9E9E9
| 147367 ||  || — || February 9, 2003 || Consell || Á. López J., R. Pacheco || — || align=right | 4.1 km || 
|-id=368 bgcolor=#d6d6d6
| 147368 ||  || — || February 1, 2003 || Kitt Peak || Spacewatch || KOR || align=right | 1.9 km || 
|-id=369 bgcolor=#E9E9E9
| 147369 ||  || — || February 21, 2003 || Palomar || NEAT || — || align=right | 2.1 km || 
|-id=370 bgcolor=#E9E9E9
| 147370 ||  || — || February 21, 2003 || Palomar || NEAT || GEF || align=right | 1.7 km || 
|-id=371 bgcolor=#E9E9E9
| 147371 ||  || — || February 21, 2003 || Palomar || NEAT || — || align=right | 3.7 km || 
|-id=372 bgcolor=#E9E9E9
| 147372 ||  || — || February 22, 2003 || Palomar || NEAT || — || align=right | 1.9 km || 
|-id=373 bgcolor=#E9E9E9
| 147373 || 2003 EB || — || March 1, 2003 || Jornada || D. S. Dixon || GEF || align=right | 1.6 km || 
|-id=374 bgcolor=#E9E9E9
| 147374 ||  || — || March 6, 2003 || Socorro || LINEAR || HOF || align=right | 5.2 km || 
|-id=375 bgcolor=#E9E9E9
| 147375 ||  || — || March 4, 2003 || Cima Ekar || ADAS || MIS || align=right | 4.2 km || 
|-id=376 bgcolor=#E9E9E9
| 147376 ||  || — || March 6, 2003 || Anderson Mesa || LONEOS || EUN || align=right | 2.3 km || 
|-id=377 bgcolor=#E9E9E9
| 147377 ||  || — || March 6, 2003 || Socorro || LINEAR || — || align=right | 2.5 km || 
|-id=378 bgcolor=#E9E9E9
| 147378 ||  || — || March 6, 2003 || Socorro || LINEAR || — || align=right | 2.7 km || 
|-id=379 bgcolor=#E9E9E9
| 147379 ||  || — || March 6, 2003 || Socorro || LINEAR || HNA || align=right | 4.9 km || 
|-id=380 bgcolor=#d6d6d6
| 147380 ||  || — || March 6, 2003 || Anderson Mesa || LONEOS || — || align=right | 3.6 km || 
|-id=381 bgcolor=#E9E9E9
| 147381 ||  || — || March 6, 2003 || Socorro || LINEAR || — || align=right | 3.6 km || 
|-id=382 bgcolor=#E9E9E9
| 147382 ||  || — || March 7, 2003 || Anderson Mesa || LONEOS || — || align=right | 3.1 km || 
|-id=383 bgcolor=#E9E9E9
| 147383 ||  || — || March 7, 2003 || Anderson Mesa || LONEOS || — || align=right | 3.1 km || 
|-id=384 bgcolor=#E9E9E9
| 147384 ||  || — || March 8, 2003 || Anderson Mesa || LONEOS || — || align=right | 4.0 km || 
|-id=385 bgcolor=#E9E9E9
| 147385 ||  || — || March 8, 2003 || Socorro || LINEAR || MAR || align=right | 2.0 km || 
|-id=386 bgcolor=#E9E9E9
| 147386 ||  || — || March 8, 2003 || Anderson Mesa || LONEOS || — || align=right | 3.4 km || 
|-id=387 bgcolor=#E9E9E9
| 147387 ||  || — || March 8, 2003 || Palomar || NEAT || MAR || align=right | 2.1 km || 
|-id=388 bgcolor=#E9E9E9
| 147388 ||  || — || March 9, 2003 || Palomar || NEAT || — || align=right | 3.2 km || 
|-id=389 bgcolor=#d6d6d6
| 147389 ||  || — || March 9, 2003 || Palomar || NEAT || TIR || align=right | 4.2 km || 
|-id=390 bgcolor=#d6d6d6
| 147390 ||  || — || March 12, 2003 || Socorro || LINEAR || — || align=right | 6.4 km || 
|-id=391 bgcolor=#E9E9E9
| 147391 ||  || — || March 11, 2003 || Socorro || LINEAR || — || align=right | 3.0 km || 
|-id=392 bgcolor=#E9E9E9
| 147392 ||  || — || March 8, 2003 || Anderson Mesa || LONEOS || — || align=right | 3.9 km || 
|-id=393 bgcolor=#d6d6d6
| 147393 ||  || — || March 9, 2003 || Socorro || LINEAR || — || align=right | 5.1 km || 
|-id=394 bgcolor=#d6d6d6
| 147394 ||  || — || March 9, 2003 || Socorro || LINEAR || EOS || align=right | 3.0 km || 
|-id=395 bgcolor=#d6d6d6
| 147395 ||  || — || March 9, 2003 || Socorro || LINEAR || — || align=right | 6.4 km || 
|-id=396 bgcolor=#d6d6d6
| 147396 ||  || — || March 12, 2003 || Socorro || LINEAR || — || align=right | 5.1 km || 
|-id=397 bgcolor=#d6d6d6
| 147397 Bobhazel ||  ||  || March 30, 2003 || Wrightwood || J. W. Young || — || align=right | 3.7 km || 
|-id=398 bgcolor=#d6d6d6
| 147398 ||  || — || March 31, 2003 || Palomar || NEAT || — || align=right | 7.3 km || 
|-id=399 bgcolor=#d6d6d6
| 147399 ||  || — || March 23, 2003 || Kitt Peak || Spacewatch || KOR || align=right | 2.3 km || 
|-id=400 bgcolor=#d6d6d6
| 147400 ||  || — || March 24, 2003 || Kitt Peak || Spacewatch || — || align=right | 4.0 km || 
|}

147401–147500 

|-bgcolor=#E9E9E9
| 147401 ||  || — || March 24, 2003 || Kitt Peak || Spacewatch || GEF || align=right | 2.6 km || 
|-id=402 bgcolor=#E9E9E9
| 147402 ||  || — || March 23, 2003 || Kitt Peak || Spacewatch || — || align=right | 2.6 km || 
|-id=403 bgcolor=#d6d6d6
| 147403 ||  || — || March 25, 2003 || Haleakala || NEAT || — || align=right | 4.1 km || 
|-id=404 bgcolor=#d6d6d6
| 147404 ||  || — || March 23, 2003 || Kitt Peak || Spacewatch || — || align=right | 4.0 km || 
|-id=405 bgcolor=#E9E9E9
| 147405 ||  || — || March 24, 2003 || Kitt Peak || Spacewatch || — || align=right | 2.0 km || 
|-id=406 bgcolor=#E9E9E9
| 147406 ||  || — || March 25, 2003 || Palomar || NEAT || — || align=right | 3.2 km || 
|-id=407 bgcolor=#d6d6d6
| 147407 ||  || — || March 26, 2003 || Palomar || NEAT || — || align=right | 4.9 km || 
|-id=408 bgcolor=#d6d6d6
| 147408 ||  || — || March 26, 2003 || Palomar || NEAT || EOS || align=right | 4.0 km || 
|-id=409 bgcolor=#d6d6d6
| 147409 ||  || — || March 26, 2003 || Palomar || NEAT || VER || align=right | 6.4 km || 
|-id=410 bgcolor=#d6d6d6
| 147410 ||  || — || March 26, 2003 || Palomar || NEAT || — || align=right | 4.0 km || 
|-id=411 bgcolor=#E9E9E9
| 147411 ||  || — || March 26, 2003 || Palomar || NEAT || — || align=right | 3.8 km || 
|-id=412 bgcolor=#d6d6d6
| 147412 ||  || — || March 27, 2003 || Kitt Peak || Spacewatch || — || align=right | 4.9 km || 
|-id=413 bgcolor=#d6d6d6
| 147413 ||  || — || March 29, 2003 || Anderson Mesa || LONEOS || EMA || align=right | 4.8 km || 
|-id=414 bgcolor=#d6d6d6
| 147414 ||  || — || March 29, 2003 || Anderson Mesa || LONEOS || — || align=right | 4.1 km || 
|-id=415 bgcolor=#d6d6d6
| 147415 ||  || — || March 30, 2003 || Socorro || LINEAR || HYG || align=right | 5.0 km || 
|-id=416 bgcolor=#d6d6d6
| 147416 ||  || — || March 31, 2003 || Kitt Peak || Spacewatch || KOR || align=right | 2.5 km || 
|-id=417 bgcolor=#E9E9E9
| 147417 ||  || — || March 24, 2003 || Haleakala || NEAT || MRX || align=right | 2.0 km || 
|-id=418 bgcolor=#E9E9E9
| 147418 ||  || — || March 25, 2003 || Palomar || NEAT || — || align=right | 3.7 km || 
|-id=419 bgcolor=#d6d6d6
| 147419 ||  || — || March 25, 2003 || Anderson Mesa || LONEOS || KOR || align=right | 2.0 km || 
|-id=420 bgcolor=#d6d6d6
| 147420 ||  || — || March 29, 2003 || Anderson Mesa || LONEOS || — || align=right | 7.0 km || 
|-id=421 bgcolor=#d6d6d6
| 147421 Gárdonyi || 2003 GG ||  || April 1, 2003 || Piszkéstető || K. Sárneczky || — || align=right | 4.0 km || 
|-id=422 bgcolor=#E9E9E9
| 147422 ||  || — || April 2, 2003 || Haleakala || NEAT || — || align=right | 4.2 km || 
|-id=423 bgcolor=#d6d6d6
| 147423 ||  || — || April 4, 2003 || Socorro || LINEAR || EOS || align=right | 4.2 km || 
|-id=424 bgcolor=#E9E9E9
| 147424 ||  || — || April 5, 2003 || Haleakala || NEAT || — || align=right | 4.5 km || 
|-id=425 bgcolor=#E9E9E9
| 147425 ||  || — || April 6, 2003 || Anderson Mesa || LONEOS || — || align=right | 3.3 km || 
|-id=426 bgcolor=#d6d6d6
| 147426 ||  || — || April 8, 2003 || Socorro || LINEAR || KOR || align=right | 2.7 km || 
|-id=427 bgcolor=#d6d6d6
| 147427 ||  || — || April 9, 2003 || Palomar || NEAT || — || align=right | 4.1 km || 
|-id=428 bgcolor=#d6d6d6
| 147428 ||  || — || April 1, 2003 || Kitt Peak || DLS || — || align=right | 4.7 km || 
|-id=429 bgcolor=#d6d6d6
| 147429 ||  || — || April 25, 2003 || Campo Imperatore || CINEOS || HYG || align=right | 4.2 km || 
|-id=430 bgcolor=#d6d6d6
| 147430 ||  || — || April 24, 2003 || Kitt Peak || Spacewatch || — || align=right | 6.2 km || 
|-id=431 bgcolor=#FA8072
| 147431 || 2003 JA || — || May 1, 2003 || Kitt Peak || Spacewatch || — || align=right data-sort-value="0.81" | 810 m || 
|-id=432 bgcolor=#d6d6d6
| 147432 ||  || — || May 2, 2003 || Kitt Peak || Spacewatch || — || align=right | 7.0 km || 
|-id=433 bgcolor=#d6d6d6
| 147433 ||  || — || May 2, 2003 || Socorro || LINEAR || EOS || align=right | 4.6 km || 
|-id=434 bgcolor=#fefefe
| 147434 ||  || — || July 22, 2003 || Palomar || NEAT || H || align=right data-sort-value="0.85" | 850 m || 
|-id=435 bgcolor=#fefefe
| 147435 ||  || — || August 25, 2003 || Palomar || NEAT || H || align=right | 1.4 km || 
|-id=436 bgcolor=#fefefe
| 147436 ||  || — || September 14, 2003 || Palomar || NEAT || H || align=right | 1.1 km || 
|-id=437 bgcolor=#fefefe
| 147437 ||  || — || September 18, 2003 || Socorro || LINEAR || H || align=right data-sort-value="0.86" | 860 m || 
|-id=438 bgcolor=#fefefe
| 147438 ||  || — || October 16, 2003 || Socorro || LINEAR || H || align=right | 1.3 km || 
|-id=439 bgcolor=#fefefe
| 147439 ||  || — || November 21, 2003 || Socorro || LINEAR || PHO || align=right | 5.0 km || 
|-id=440 bgcolor=#E9E9E9
| 147440 ||  || — || December 14, 2003 || Kitt Peak || Spacewatch || HEN || align=right | 1.7 km || 
|-id=441 bgcolor=#fefefe
| 147441 ||  || — || December 14, 2003 || Kitt Peak || Spacewatch || — || align=right | 2.0 km || 
|-id=442 bgcolor=#fefefe
| 147442 ||  || — || December 1, 2003 || Socorro || LINEAR || — || align=right | 1.5 km || 
|-id=443 bgcolor=#fefefe
| 147443 ||  || — || December 17, 2003 || Kitt Peak || Spacewatch || — || align=right | 1.2 km || 
|-id=444 bgcolor=#fefefe
| 147444 ||  || — || December 18, 2003 || Socorro || LINEAR || — || align=right | 1.3 km || 
|-id=445 bgcolor=#fefefe
| 147445 ||  || — || December 19, 2003 || Kitt Peak || Spacewatch || FLO || align=right | 1.1 km || 
|-id=446 bgcolor=#fefefe
| 147446 ||  || — || December 21, 2003 || Catalina || CSS || — || align=right | 2.2 km || 
|-id=447 bgcolor=#fefefe
| 147447 ||  || — || December 27, 2003 || Socorro || LINEAR || — || align=right | 1.6 km || 
|-id=448 bgcolor=#fefefe
| 147448 ||  || — || December 18, 2003 || Palomar || NEAT || — || align=right | 1.3 km || 
|-id=449 bgcolor=#fefefe
| 147449 ||  || — || December 29, 2003 || Catalina || CSS || H || align=right | 1.6 km || 
|-id=450 bgcolor=#fefefe
| 147450 ||  || — || December 18, 2003 || Kitt Peak || Spacewatch || — || align=right | 1.5 km || 
|-id=451 bgcolor=#fefefe
| 147451 ||  || — || January 16, 2004 || Palomar || NEAT || NYS || align=right | 1.4 km || 
|-id=452 bgcolor=#fefefe
| 147452 ||  || — || January 17, 2004 || Palomar || NEAT || — || align=right | 1.5 km || 
|-id=453 bgcolor=#fefefe
| 147453 ||  || — || January 17, 2004 || Haleakala || NEAT || — || align=right | 1.2 km || 
|-id=454 bgcolor=#fefefe
| 147454 ||  || — || January 16, 2004 || Palomar || NEAT || — || align=right | 1.6 km || 
|-id=455 bgcolor=#fefefe
| 147455 ||  || — || January 16, 2004 || Catalina || CSS || — || align=right | 1.3 km || 
|-id=456 bgcolor=#fefefe
| 147456 ||  || — || January 18, 2004 || Palomar || NEAT || — || align=right | 1.1 km || 
|-id=457 bgcolor=#fefefe
| 147457 ||  || — || January 19, 2004 || Kitt Peak || Spacewatch || — || align=right | 1.2 km || 
|-id=458 bgcolor=#fefefe
| 147458 ||  || — || January 22, 2004 || Palomar || NEAT || fast? || align=right | 1.2 km || 
|-id=459 bgcolor=#fefefe
| 147459 ||  || — || January 21, 2004 || Socorro || LINEAR || — || align=right | 1.3 km || 
|-id=460 bgcolor=#fefefe
| 147460 ||  || — || January 23, 2004 || Anderson Mesa || LONEOS || NYS || align=right | 1.2 km || 
|-id=461 bgcolor=#fefefe
| 147461 ||  || — || January 22, 2004 || Socorro || LINEAR || — || align=right | 1.1 km || 
|-id=462 bgcolor=#fefefe
| 147462 ||  || — || January 22, 2004 || Socorro || LINEAR || — || align=right | 1.3 km || 
|-id=463 bgcolor=#fefefe
| 147463 ||  || — || January 24, 2004 || Socorro || LINEAR || FLO || align=right data-sort-value="0.87" | 870 m || 
|-id=464 bgcolor=#fefefe
| 147464 ||  || — || January 24, 2004 || Socorro || LINEAR || — || align=right | 1.3 km || 
|-id=465 bgcolor=#fefefe
| 147465 ||  || — || January 24, 2004 || Socorro || LINEAR || NYS || align=right | 1.4 km || 
|-id=466 bgcolor=#E9E9E9
| 147466 ||  || — || January 24, 2004 || Socorro || LINEAR || — || align=right | 2.7 km || 
|-id=467 bgcolor=#fefefe
| 147467 ||  || — || January 28, 2004 || Catalina || CSS || FLO || align=right | 1.2 km || 
|-id=468 bgcolor=#fefefe
| 147468 ||  || — || January 29, 2004 || Anderson Mesa || LONEOS || — || align=right | 2.5 km || 
|-id=469 bgcolor=#fefefe
| 147469 ||  || — || January 28, 2004 || Catalina || CSS || — || align=right | 1.3 km || 
|-id=470 bgcolor=#fefefe
| 147470 ||  || — || January 29, 2004 || Socorro || LINEAR || — || align=right | 1.5 km || 
|-id=471 bgcolor=#fefefe
| 147471 ||  || — || January 16, 2004 || Kitt Peak || Spacewatch || — || align=right data-sort-value="0.91" | 910 m || 
|-id=472 bgcolor=#fefefe
| 147472 ||  || — || January 19, 2004 || Anderson Mesa || LONEOS || — || align=right | 1.2 km || 
|-id=473 bgcolor=#fefefe
| 147473 ||  || — || February 10, 2004 || Catalina || CSS || — || align=right | 1.3 km || 
|-id=474 bgcolor=#fefefe
| 147474 ||  || — || February 11, 2004 || Kitt Peak || Spacewatch || — || align=right | 1.1 km || 
|-id=475 bgcolor=#fefefe
| 147475 ||  || — || February 12, 2004 || Kitt Peak || Spacewatch || — || align=right | 1.5 km || 
|-id=476 bgcolor=#fefefe
| 147476 ||  || — || February 12, 2004 || Kitt Peak || Spacewatch || MAS || align=right | 1.4 km || 
|-id=477 bgcolor=#fefefe
| 147477 ||  || — || February 11, 2004 || Palomar || NEAT || — || align=right | 1.3 km || 
|-id=478 bgcolor=#fefefe
| 147478 ||  || — || February 12, 2004 || Kitt Peak || Spacewatch || NYS || align=right data-sort-value="0.87" | 870 m || 
|-id=479 bgcolor=#fefefe
| 147479 ||  || — || February 12, 2004 || Kitt Peak || Spacewatch || NYS || align=right | 1.3 km || 
|-id=480 bgcolor=#fefefe
| 147480 ||  || — || February 13, 2004 || Kitt Peak || Spacewatch || — || align=right | 1.8 km || 
|-id=481 bgcolor=#fefefe
| 147481 ||  || — || February 12, 2004 || Palomar || NEAT || — || align=right | 4.3 km || 
|-id=482 bgcolor=#fefefe
| 147482 ||  || — || February 12, 2004 || Kitt Peak || Spacewatch || NYS || align=right data-sort-value="0.93" | 930 m || 
|-id=483 bgcolor=#fefefe
| 147483 ||  || — || February 11, 2004 || Anderson Mesa || LONEOS || — || align=right | 1.3 km || 
|-id=484 bgcolor=#E9E9E9
| 147484 ||  || — || February 11, 2004 || Kitt Peak || Spacewatch || — || align=right | 2.3 km || 
|-id=485 bgcolor=#fefefe
| 147485 ||  || — || February 11, 2004 || Palomar || NEAT || — || align=right | 1.5 km || 
|-id=486 bgcolor=#fefefe
| 147486 ||  || — || February 13, 2004 || Palomar || NEAT || — || align=right | 1.4 km || 
|-id=487 bgcolor=#fefefe
| 147487 ||  || — || February 14, 2004 || Haleakala || NEAT || MAS || align=right | 1.1 km || 
|-id=488 bgcolor=#fefefe
| 147488 ||  || — || February 10, 2004 || Palomar || NEAT || — || align=right | 1.6 km || 
|-id=489 bgcolor=#fefefe
| 147489 ||  || — || February 15, 2004 || Palomar || NEAT || — || align=right | 1.7 km || 
|-id=490 bgcolor=#fefefe
| 147490 ||  || — || February 11, 2004 || Anderson Mesa || LONEOS || — || align=right data-sort-value="0.90" | 900 m || 
|-id=491 bgcolor=#E9E9E9
| 147491 ||  || — || February 11, 2004 || Palomar || NEAT || HEN || align=right | 2.2 km || 
|-id=492 bgcolor=#fefefe
| 147492 ||  || — || February 11, 2004 || Palomar || NEAT || MAS || align=right | 1.2 km || 
|-id=493 bgcolor=#fefefe
| 147493 ||  || — || February 11, 2004 || Palomar || NEAT || — || align=right | 1.2 km || 
|-id=494 bgcolor=#fefefe
| 147494 ||  || — || February 14, 2004 || Kitt Peak || Spacewatch || — || align=right | 1.1 km || 
|-id=495 bgcolor=#fefefe
| 147495 ||  || — || February 14, 2004 || Haleakala || NEAT || — || align=right | 1.1 km || 
|-id=496 bgcolor=#fefefe
| 147496 ||  || — || February 13, 2004 || Palomar || NEAT || NYS || align=right data-sort-value="0.97" | 970 m || 
|-id=497 bgcolor=#fefefe
| 147497 ||  || — || February 15, 2004 || Catalina || CSS || NYS || align=right | 1.4 km || 
|-id=498 bgcolor=#fefefe
| 147498 ||  || — || February 15, 2004 || Catalina || CSS || NYS || align=right | 3.6 km || 
|-id=499 bgcolor=#fefefe
| 147499 ||  || — || February 15, 2004 || Catalina || CSS || — || align=right | 1.3 km || 
|-id=500 bgcolor=#fefefe
| 147500 ||  || — || February 15, 2004 || Catalina || CSS || — || align=right | 1.7 km || 
|}

147501–147600 

|-bgcolor=#fefefe
| 147501 ||  || — || February 12, 2004 || Palomar || NEAT || V || align=right | 1.3 km || 
|-id=502 bgcolor=#fefefe
| 147502 ||  || — || February 12, 2004 || Palomar || NEAT || — || align=right | 1.4 km || 
|-id=503 bgcolor=#fefefe
| 147503 ||  || — || February 13, 2004 || Palomar || NEAT || — || align=right | 1.3 km || 
|-id=504 bgcolor=#fefefe
| 147504 ||  || — || February 14, 2004 || Palomar || NEAT || — || align=right | 1.6 km || 
|-id=505 bgcolor=#fefefe
| 147505 ||  || — || February 14, 2004 || Palomar || NEAT || — || align=right | 2.0 km || 
|-id=506 bgcolor=#fefefe
| 147506 ||  || — || February 14, 2004 || Palomar || NEAT || — || align=right | 1.5 km || 
|-id=507 bgcolor=#E9E9E9
| 147507 ||  || — || February 15, 2004 || Socorro || LINEAR || KRM || align=right | 4.0 km || 
|-id=508 bgcolor=#fefefe
| 147508 ||  || — || February 16, 2004 || Kitt Peak || Spacewatch || V || align=right | 1.1 km || 
|-id=509 bgcolor=#fefefe
| 147509 ||  || — || February 16, 2004 || Kitt Peak || Spacewatch || FLO || align=right | 1.0 km || 
|-id=510 bgcolor=#fefefe
| 147510 ||  || — || February 17, 2004 || Socorro || LINEAR || — || align=right | 1.6 km || 
|-id=511 bgcolor=#fefefe
| 147511 ||  || — || February 17, 2004 || Socorro || LINEAR || — || align=right | 1.7 km || 
|-id=512 bgcolor=#fefefe
| 147512 ||  || — || February 16, 2004 || Catalina || CSS || — || align=right | 1.5 km || 
|-id=513 bgcolor=#fefefe
| 147513 ||  || — || February 18, 2004 || Socorro || LINEAR || — || align=right | 1.3 km || 
|-id=514 bgcolor=#E9E9E9
| 147514 ||  || — || February 18, 2004 || Haleakala || NEAT || — || align=right | 2.2 km || 
|-id=515 bgcolor=#fefefe
| 147515 ||  || — || February 17, 2004 || Catalina || CSS || V || align=right | 1.3 km || 
|-id=516 bgcolor=#fefefe
| 147516 ||  || — || February 19, 2004 || Socorro || LINEAR || — || align=right | 1.5 km || 
|-id=517 bgcolor=#fefefe
| 147517 ||  || — || February 19, 2004 || Socorro || LINEAR || NYS || align=right | 1.2 km || 
|-id=518 bgcolor=#E9E9E9
| 147518 ||  || — || February 19, 2004 || Socorro || LINEAR || — || align=right | 2.7 km || 
|-id=519 bgcolor=#fefefe
| 147519 ||  || — || February 19, 2004 || Socorro || LINEAR || — || align=right | 1.3 km || 
|-id=520 bgcolor=#fefefe
| 147520 ||  || — || February 18, 2004 || Desert Eagle || W. K. Y. Yeung || FLO || align=right | 1.1 km || 
|-id=521 bgcolor=#fefefe
| 147521 ||  || — || February 18, 2004 || Haleakala || NEAT || — || align=right | 1.6 km || 
|-id=522 bgcolor=#fefefe
| 147522 ||  || — || February 19, 2004 || Socorro || LINEAR || FLO || align=right | 1.2 km || 
|-id=523 bgcolor=#fefefe
| 147523 ||  || — || February 19, 2004 || Socorro || LINEAR || NYS || align=right | 1.2 km || 
|-id=524 bgcolor=#fefefe
| 147524 ||  || — || February 19, 2004 || Socorro || LINEAR || — || align=right | 1.3 km || 
|-id=525 bgcolor=#E9E9E9
| 147525 ||  || — || February 26, 2004 || Desert Eagle || W. K. Y. Yeung || — || align=right | 2.2 km || 
|-id=526 bgcolor=#fefefe
| 147526 ||  || — || February 23, 2004 || Socorro || LINEAR || NYS || align=right | 1.4 km || 
|-id=527 bgcolor=#fefefe
| 147527 ||  || — || February 19, 2004 || Socorro || LINEAR || V || align=right | 1.00 km || 
|-id=528 bgcolor=#fefefe
| 147528 ||  || — || February 25, 2004 || Socorro || LINEAR || — || align=right | 1.1 km || 
|-id=529 bgcolor=#fefefe
| 147529 ||  || — || February 26, 2004 || Goodricke-Pigott || R. A. Tucker || — || align=right | 1.6 km || 
|-id=530 bgcolor=#fefefe
| 147530 ||  || — || February 26, 2004 || Socorro || LINEAR || NYS || align=right | 1.4 km || 
|-id=531 bgcolor=#fefefe
| 147531 ||  || — || February 26, 2004 || Socorro || LINEAR || FLO || align=right | 1.1 km || 
|-id=532 bgcolor=#fefefe
| 147532 ||  || — || February 23, 2004 || Socorro || LINEAR || NYS || align=right | 1.3 km || 
|-id=533 bgcolor=#fefefe
| 147533 ||  || — || March 10, 2004 || Catalina || CSS || — || align=right | 1.6 km || 
|-id=534 bgcolor=#fefefe
| 147534 ||  || — || March 12, 2004 || Palomar || NEAT || — || align=right | 1.3 km || 
|-id=535 bgcolor=#fefefe
| 147535 ||  || — || March 11, 2004 || Palomar || NEAT || NYS || align=right | 3.8 km || 
|-id=536 bgcolor=#fefefe
| 147536 ||  || — || March 11, 2004 || Palomar || NEAT || — || align=right | 1.5 km || 
|-id=537 bgcolor=#fefefe
| 147537 ||  || — || March 11, 2004 || Palomar || NEAT || V || align=right | 1.3 km || 
|-id=538 bgcolor=#fefefe
| 147538 ||  || — || March 15, 2004 || Črni Vrh || Črni Vrh || — || align=right | 1.3 km || 
|-id=539 bgcolor=#fefefe
| 147539 ||  || — || March 14, 2004 || Catalina || CSS || — || align=right | 1.4 km || 
|-id=540 bgcolor=#fefefe
| 147540 ||  || — || March 15, 2004 || Kitt Peak || Spacewatch || MAS || align=right | 1.2 km || 
|-id=541 bgcolor=#fefefe
| 147541 ||  || — || March 14, 2004 || Palomar || NEAT || — || align=right | 1.6 km || 
|-id=542 bgcolor=#fefefe
| 147542 ||  || — || March 14, 2004 || Palomar || NEAT || — || align=right | 1.7 km || 
|-id=543 bgcolor=#E9E9E9
| 147543 ||  || — || March 15, 2004 || Palomar || NEAT || — || align=right | 1.8 km || 
|-id=544 bgcolor=#fefefe
| 147544 ||  || — || March 13, 2004 || Palomar || NEAT || — || align=right | 1.3 km || 
|-id=545 bgcolor=#fefefe
| 147545 ||  || — || March 12, 2004 || Palomar || NEAT || NYS || align=right | 2.7 km || 
|-id=546 bgcolor=#fefefe
| 147546 ||  || — || March 14, 2004 || Kitt Peak || Spacewatch || — || align=right | 1.0 km || 
|-id=547 bgcolor=#E9E9E9
| 147547 ||  || — || March 15, 2004 || Catalina || CSS || — || align=right | 1.7 km || 
|-id=548 bgcolor=#fefefe
| 147548 ||  || — || March 15, 2004 || Catalina || CSS || — || align=right | 1.2 km || 
|-id=549 bgcolor=#E9E9E9
| 147549 ||  || — || March 12, 2004 || Palomar || NEAT || — || align=right | 1.8 km || 
|-id=550 bgcolor=#fefefe
| 147550 ||  || — || March 13, 2004 || Palomar || NEAT || NYS || align=right | 1.5 km || 
|-id=551 bgcolor=#fefefe
| 147551 ||  || — || March 14, 2004 || Socorro || LINEAR || V || align=right | 1.5 km || 
|-id=552 bgcolor=#fefefe
| 147552 ||  || — || March 15, 2004 || Socorro || LINEAR || — || align=right | 1.4 km || 
|-id=553 bgcolor=#fefefe
| 147553 ||  || — || March 15, 2004 || Socorro || LINEAR || — || align=right | 1.4 km || 
|-id=554 bgcolor=#E9E9E9
| 147554 ||  || — || March 15, 2004 || Catalina || CSS || HNS || align=right | 2.0 km || 
|-id=555 bgcolor=#fefefe
| 147555 ||  || — || March 16, 2004 || Catalina || CSS || FLO || align=right | 1.1 km || 
|-id=556 bgcolor=#fefefe
| 147556 ||  || — || March 16, 2004 || Catalina || CSS || — || align=right | 1.3 km || 
|-id=557 bgcolor=#fefefe
| 147557 ||  || — || March 16, 2004 || Catalina || CSS || NYS || align=right data-sort-value="0.99" | 990 m || 
|-id=558 bgcolor=#fefefe
| 147558 ||  || — || March 16, 2004 || Catalina || CSS || — || align=right | 1.3 km || 
|-id=559 bgcolor=#fefefe
| 147559 ||  || — || March 16, 2004 || Catalina || CSS || NYS || align=right | 1.3 km || 
|-id=560 bgcolor=#E9E9E9
| 147560 ||  || — || March 17, 2004 || Socorro || LINEAR || slow || align=right | 2.4 km || 
|-id=561 bgcolor=#fefefe
| 147561 ||  || — || March 17, 2004 || Socorro || LINEAR || — || align=right | 1.5 km || 
|-id=562 bgcolor=#fefefe
| 147562 ||  || — || March 30, 2004 || Socorro || LINEAR || PHO || align=right | 4.5 km || 
|-id=563 bgcolor=#fefefe
| 147563 ||  || — || March 16, 2004 || Catalina || CSS || V || align=right | 1.4 km || 
|-id=564 bgcolor=#fefefe
| 147564 ||  || — || March 16, 2004 || Catalina || CSS || — || align=right | 1.4 km || 
|-id=565 bgcolor=#fefefe
| 147565 ||  || — || March 16, 2004 || Socorro || LINEAR || — || align=right | 1.7 km || 
|-id=566 bgcolor=#E9E9E9
| 147566 ||  || — || March 16, 2004 || Campo Imperatore || CINEOS || — || align=right | 2.4 km || 
|-id=567 bgcolor=#fefefe
| 147567 ||  || — || March 18, 2004 || Socorro || LINEAR || NYS || align=right | 1.0 km || 
|-id=568 bgcolor=#fefefe
| 147568 ||  || — || March 16, 2004 || Kitt Peak || Spacewatch || — || align=right | 1.4 km || 
|-id=569 bgcolor=#fefefe
| 147569 ||  || — || March 18, 2004 || Socorro || LINEAR || — || align=right | 1.2 km || 
|-id=570 bgcolor=#E9E9E9
| 147570 ||  || — || March 17, 2004 || Kitt Peak || Spacewatch || — || align=right | 1.6 km || 
|-id=571 bgcolor=#d6d6d6
| 147571 ||  || — || March 19, 2004 || Kitt Peak || Spacewatch || — || align=right | 4.2 km || 
|-id=572 bgcolor=#fefefe
| 147572 ||  || — || March 17, 2004 || Socorro || LINEAR || — || align=right | 1.2 km || 
|-id=573 bgcolor=#fefefe
| 147573 ||  || — || March 19, 2004 || Socorro || LINEAR || NYS || align=right | 4.4 km || 
|-id=574 bgcolor=#fefefe
| 147574 ||  || — || March 20, 2004 || Socorro || LINEAR || — || align=right | 1.5 km || 
|-id=575 bgcolor=#E9E9E9
| 147575 ||  || — || March 16, 2004 || Kitt Peak || Spacewatch || — || align=right | 1.9 km || 
|-id=576 bgcolor=#fefefe
| 147576 ||  || — || March 22, 2004 || Socorro || LINEAR || NYS || align=right | 1.2 km || 
|-id=577 bgcolor=#fefefe
| 147577 ||  || — || March 23, 2004 || Socorro || LINEAR || — || align=right | 1.3 km || 
|-id=578 bgcolor=#fefefe
| 147578 ||  || — || March 20, 2004 || Socorro || LINEAR || NYS || align=right | 2.9 km || 
|-id=579 bgcolor=#E9E9E9
| 147579 ||  || — || March 24, 2004 || Anderson Mesa || LONEOS || — || align=right | 2.7 km || 
|-id=580 bgcolor=#fefefe
| 147580 ||  || — || March 27, 2004 || Socorro || LINEAR || FLO || align=right data-sort-value="0.98" | 980 m || 
|-id=581 bgcolor=#fefefe
| 147581 ||  || — || March 27, 2004 || Socorro || LINEAR || — || align=right | 1.1 km || 
|-id=582 bgcolor=#fefefe
| 147582 ||  || — || March 22, 2004 || Anderson Mesa || LONEOS || FLO || align=right | 1.8 km || 
|-id=583 bgcolor=#fefefe
| 147583 ||  || — || March 22, 2004 || Anderson Mesa || LONEOS || — || align=right | 1.7 km || 
|-id=584 bgcolor=#fefefe
| 147584 ||  || — || March 26, 2004 || Anderson Mesa || LONEOS || — || align=right | 1.6 km || 
|-id=585 bgcolor=#fefefe
| 147585 ||  || — || March 26, 2004 || Socorro || LINEAR || — || align=right | 1.4 km || 
|-id=586 bgcolor=#fefefe
| 147586 ||  || — || March 27, 2004 || Catalina || CSS || NYS || align=right | 1.0 km || 
|-id=587 bgcolor=#fefefe
| 147587 ||  || — || March 18, 2004 || Socorro || LINEAR || NYS || align=right data-sort-value="0.94" | 940 m || 
|-id=588 bgcolor=#fefefe
| 147588 ||  || — || March 18, 2004 || Kitt Peak || Spacewatch || — || align=right | 1.1 km || 
|-id=589 bgcolor=#d6d6d6
| 147589 || 2004 GG || — || April 8, 2004 || Siding Spring || SSS || — || align=right | 5.0 km || 
|-id=590 bgcolor=#E9E9E9
| 147590 ||  || — || April 9, 2004 || Siding Spring || SSS || — || align=right | 1.9 km || 
|-id=591 bgcolor=#E9E9E9
| 147591 ||  || — || April 12, 2004 || Kitt Peak || Spacewatch || — || align=right | 3.9 km || 
|-id=592 bgcolor=#fefefe
| 147592 ||  || — || April 13, 2004 || Palomar || NEAT || V || align=right | 1.1 km || 
|-id=593 bgcolor=#E9E9E9
| 147593 ||  || — || April 13, 2004 || Siding Spring || SSS || — || align=right | 2.5 km || 
|-id=594 bgcolor=#fefefe
| 147594 ||  || — || April 10, 2004 || Palomar || NEAT || FLO || align=right | 1.0 km || 
|-id=595 bgcolor=#E9E9E9
| 147595 Gojkomitić ||  ||  || April 14, 2004 || Drebach || A. Knöfel, G. Lehmann || — || align=right | 1.5 km || 
|-id=596 bgcolor=#E9E9E9
| 147596 ||  || — || April 13, 2004 || Siding Spring || SSS || — || align=right | 3.0 km || 
|-id=597 bgcolor=#fefefe
| 147597 ||  || — || April 14, 2004 || Anderson Mesa || LONEOS || — || align=right | 1.5 km || 
|-id=598 bgcolor=#E9E9E9
| 147598 ||  || — || April 14, 2004 || Anderson Mesa || LONEOS || — || align=right | 2.9 km || 
|-id=599 bgcolor=#E9E9E9
| 147599 ||  || — || April 14, 2004 || Anderson Mesa || LONEOS || — || align=right | 3.7 km || 
|-id=600 bgcolor=#E9E9E9
| 147600 ||  || — || April 14, 2004 || Anderson Mesa || LONEOS || — || align=right | 4.7 km || 
|}

147601–147700 

|-bgcolor=#E9E9E9
| 147601 ||  || — || April 12, 2004 || Kitt Peak || Spacewatch || — || align=right | 2.1 km || 
|-id=602 bgcolor=#fefefe
| 147602 ||  || — || April 12, 2004 || Kitt Peak || Spacewatch || FLO || align=right data-sort-value="0.97" | 970 m || 
|-id=603 bgcolor=#fefefe
| 147603 ||  || — || April 12, 2004 || Palomar || NEAT || — || align=right | 1.5 km || 
|-id=604 bgcolor=#E9E9E9
| 147604 ||  || — || April 13, 2004 || Palomar || NEAT || — || align=right | 1.4 km || 
|-id=605 bgcolor=#fefefe
| 147605 ||  || — || April 14, 2004 || Anderson Mesa || LONEOS || — || align=right | 1.9 km || 
|-id=606 bgcolor=#d6d6d6
| 147606 ||  || — || April 15, 2004 || Anderson Mesa || LONEOS || — || align=right | 4.6 km || 
|-id=607 bgcolor=#fefefe
| 147607 ||  || — || April 12, 2004 || Kitt Peak || Spacewatch || NYS || align=right | 3.4 km || 
|-id=608 bgcolor=#E9E9E9
| 147608 ||  || — || April 12, 2004 || Kitt Peak || Spacewatch || — || align=right | 1.3 km || 
|-id=609 bgcolor=#E9E9E9
| 147609 ||  || — || April 13, 2004 || Kitt Peak || Spacewatch || — || align=right | 2.5 km || 
|-id=610 bgcolor=#E9E9E9
| 147610 ||  || — || April 13, 2004 || Kitt Peak || Spacewatch || WIT || align=right | 1.2 km || 
|-id=611 bgcolor=#fefefe
| 147611 ||  || — || April 13, 2004 || Kitt Peak || Spacewatch || — || align=right | 1.1 km || 
|-id=612 bgcolor=#d6d6d6
| 147612 ||  || — || April 12, 2004 || Kitt Peak || Spacewatch || — || align=right | 4.9 km || 
|-id=613 bgcolor=#fefefe
| 147613 ||  || — || April 16, 2004 || Anderson Mesa || LONEOS || — || align=right | 1.5 km || 
|-id=614 bgcolor=#E9E9E9
| 147614 ||  || — || April 16, 2004 || Palomar || NEAT || — || align=right | 2.0 km || 
|-id=615 bgcolor=#E9E9E9
| 147615 ||  || — || April 16, 2004 || Kitt Peak || Spacewatch || — || align=right | 2.6 km || 
|-id=616 bgcolor=#fefefe
| 147616 ||  || — || April 17, 2004 || Socorro || LINEAR || NYS || align=right | 1.1 km || 
|-id=617 bgcolor=#fefefe
| 147617 ||  || — || April 17, 2004 || Socorro || LINEAR || — || align=right | 1.4 km || 
|-id=618 bgcolor=#fefefe
| 147618 ||  || — || April 17, 2004 || Socorro || LINEAR || NYS || align=right | 1.1 km || 
|-id=619 bgcolor=#fefefe
| 147619 ||  || — || April 16, 2004 || Kitt Peak || Spacewatch || — || align=right | 1.5 km || 
|-id=620 bgcolor=#E9E9E9
| 147620 ||  || — || April 17, 2004 || Socorro || LINEAR || — || align=right | 1.6 km || 
|-id=621 bgcolor=#E9E9E9
| 147621 ||  || — || April 20, 2004 || Socorro || LINEAR || — || align=right | 1.9 km || 
|-id=622 bgcolor=#E9E9E9
| 147622 ||  || — || April 19, 2004 || Socorro || LINEAR || — || align=right | 3.6 km || 
|-id=623 bgcolor=#E9E9E9
| 147623 ||  || — || April 20, 2004 || Catalina || CSS || MAR || align=right | 2.1 km || 
|-id=624 bgcolor=#fefefe
| 147624 ||  || — || April 22, 2004 || Socorro || LINEAR || — || align=right | 2.0 km || 
|-id=625 bgcolor=#E9E9E9
| 147625 ||  || — || April 20, 2004 || Socorro || LINEAR || — || align=right | 1.8 km || 
|-id=626 bgcolor=#d6d6d6
| 147626 ||  || — || April 21, 2004 || Socorro || LINEAR || CHA || align=right | 3.5 km || 
|-id=627 bgcolor=#E9E9E9
| 147627 ||  || — || April 21, 2004 || Socorro || LINEAR || — || align=right | 1.6 km || 
|-id=628 bgcolor=#d6d6d6
| 147628 ||  || — || April 22, 2004 || Kitt Peak || Spacewatch || URS || align=right | 5.5 km || 
|-id=629 bgcolor=#E9E9E9
| 147629 ||  || — || April 22, 2004 || Siding Spring || SSS || — || align=right | 2.3 km || 
|-id=630 bgcolor=#fefefe
| 147630 ||  || — || April 23, 2004 || Socorro || LINEAR || FLO || align=right | 1.1 km || 
|-id=631 bgcolor=#E9E9E9
| 147631 ||  || — || April 24, 2004 || Socorro || LINEAR || EUN || align=right | 2.5 km || 
|-id=632 bgcolor=#E9E9E9
| 147632 ||  || — || April 20, 2004 || Socorro || LINEAR || — || align=right | 1.6 km || 
|-id=633 bgcolor=#E9E9E9
| 147633 ||  || — || April 22, 2004 || Kitt Peak || Spacewatch || — || align=right | 2.7 km || 
|-id=634 bgcolor=#E9E9E9
| 147634 ||  || — || April 22, 2004 || Kitt Peak || Spacewatch || — || align=right | 1.4 km || 
|-id=635 bgcolor=#E9E9E9
| 147635 ||  || — || April 16, 2004 || Socorro || LINEAR || — || align=right | 2.2 km || 
|-id=636 bgcolor=#fefefe
| 147636 ||  || — || April 21, 2004 || Kitt Peak || Spacewatch || — || align=right | 1.2 km || 
|-id=637 bgcolor=#E9E9E9
| 147637 ||  || — || May 9, 2004 || Palomar || NEAT || — || align=right | 2.8 km || 
|-id=638 bgcolor=#d6d6d6
| 147638 ||  || — || May 13, 2004 || Anderson Mesa || LONEOS || — || align=right | 5.5 km || 
|-id=639 bgcolor=#E9E9E9
| 147639 ||  || — || May 12, 2004 || Catalina || CSS || — || align=right | 4.4 km || 
|-id=640 bgcolor=#E9E9E9
| 147640 ||  || — || May 11, 2004 || Siding Spring || SSS || EUN || align=right | 2.4 km || 
|-id=641 bgcolor=#fefefe
| 147641 ||  || — || May 9, 2004 || Kitt Peak || Spacewatch || — || align=right | 2.6 km || 
|-id=642 bgcolor=#d6d6d6
| 147642 ||  || — || May 10, 2004 || Palomar || NEAT || — || align=right | 4.1 km || 
|-id=643 bgcolor=#fefefe
| 147643 ||  || — || May 12, 2004 || Siding Spring || SSS || — || align=right | 1.3 km || 
|-id=644 bgcolor=#d6d6d6
| 147644 ||  || — || May 12, 2004 || Siding Spring || SSS || — || align=right | 4.8 km || 
|-id=645 bgcolor=#E9E9E9
| 147645 ||  || — || May 15, 2004 || Socorro || LINEAR || — || align=right | 3.2 km || 
|-id=646 bgcolor=#fefefe
| 147646 ||  || — || May 15, 2004 || Socorro || LINEAR || NYS || align=right data-sort-value="0.99" | 990 m || 
|-id=647 bgcolor=#E9E9E9
| 147647 ||  || — || May 15, 2004 || Socorro || LINEAR || — || align=right | 2.0 km || 
|-id=648 bgcolor=#E9E9E9
| 147648 ||  || — || May 15, 2004 || Socorro || LINEAR || — || align=right | 2.9 km || 
|-id=649 bgcolor=#d6d6d6
| 147649 ||  || — || May 15, 2004 || Socorro || LINEAR || EOS || align=right | 3.3 km || 
|-id=650 bgcolor=#d6d6d6
| 147650 ||  || — || May 12, 2004 || Catalina || CSS || HYG || align=right | 4.9 km || 
|-id=651 bgcolor=#E9E9E9
| 147651 ||  || — || May 15, 2004 || Socorro || LINEAR || HOF || align=right | 4.8 km || 
|-id=652 bgcolor=#E9E9E9
| 147652 ||  || — || May 15, 2004 || Socorro || LINEAR || — || align=right | 3.7 km || 
|-id=653 bgcolor=#E9E9E9
| 147653 ||  || — || May 15, 2004 || Socorro || LINEAR || — || align=right | 4.8 km || 
|-id=654 bgcolor=#E9E9E9
| 147654 ||  || — || May 15, 2004 || Socorro || LINEAR || — || align=right | 2.3 km || 
|-id=655 bgcolor=#fefefe
| 147655 ||  || — || May 15, 2004 || Needville || P. Garossino || — || align=right | 1.5 km || 
|-id=656 bgcolor=#d6d6d6
| 147656 ||  || — || May 13, 2004 || Kitt Peak || Spacewatch || — || align=right | 4.3 km || 
|-id=657 bgcolor=#fefefe
| 147657 ||  || — || May 13, 2004 || Palomar || NEAT || — || align=right | 1.5 km || 
|-id=658 bgcolor=#fefefe
| 147658 ||  || — || May 15, 2004 || Socorro || LINEAR || — || align=right | 1.8 km || 
|-id=659 bgcolor=#fefefe
| 147659 ||  || — || May 15, 2004 || Socorro || LINEAR || — || align=right | 1.2 km || 
|-id=660 bgcolor=#fefefe
| 147660 ||  || — || May 15, 2004 || Socorro || LINEAR || FLO || align=right | 1.1 km || 
|-id=661 bgcolor=#E9E9E9
| 147661 ||  || — || May 14, 2004 || Socorro || LINEAR || GEF || align=right | 2.8 km || 
|-id=662 bgcolor=#E9E9E9
| 147662 ||  || — || May 10, 2004 || Kitt Peak || Spacewatch || — || align=right | 3.3 km || 
|-id=663 bgcolor=#fefefe
| 147663 || 2004 KD || — || May 16, 2004 || Reedy Creek || J. Broughton || — || align=right | 2.7 km || 
|-id=664 bgcolor=#d6d6d6
| 147664 ||  || — || May 16, 2004 || Socorro || LINEAR || TIR || align=right | 2.5 km || 
|-id=665 bgcolor=#E9E9E9
| 147665 ||  || — || May 17, 2004 || Socorro || LINEAR || — || align=right | 2.2 km || 
|-id=666 bgcolor=#E9E9E9
| 147666 ||  || — || May 19, 2004 || Kitt Peak || Spacewatch || — || align=right | 1.6 km || 
|-id=667 bgcolor=#fefefe
| 147667 ||  || — || May 19, 2004 || Socorro || LINEAR || — || align=right | 1.5 km || 
|-id=668 bgcolor=#d6d6d6
| 147668 ||  || — || May 22, 2004 || Catalina || CSS || — || align=right | 2.8 km || 
|-id=669 bgcolor=#E9E9E9
| 147669 ||  || — || May 23, 2004 || Socorro || LINEAR || — || align=right | 3.6 km || 
|-id=670 bgcolor=#E9E9E9
| 147670 ||  || — || June 11, 2004 || Socorro || LINEAR || — || align=right | 2.0 km || 
|-id=671 bgcolor=#d6d6d6
| 147671 ||  || — || June 13, 2004 || Kitt Peak || Spacewatch || NAE || align=right | 5.2 km || 
|-id=672 bgcolor=#E9E9E9
| 147672 ||  || — || June 8, 2004 || Kitt Peak || Spacewatch || PAD || align=right | 3.6 km || 
|-id=673 bgcolor=#d6d6d6
| 147673 ||  || — || June 12, 2004 || Socorro || LINEAR || — || align=right | 5.7 km || 
|-id=674 bgcolor=#fefefe
| 147674 ||  || — || June 11, 2004 || Kitt Peak || Spacewatch || — || align=right | 1.6 km || 
|-id=675 bgcolor=#E9E9E9
| 147675 || 2004 ML || — || June 16, 2004 || Socorro || LINEAR || NEM || align=right | 4.4 km || 
|-id=676 bgcolor=#E9E9E9
| 147676 ||  || — || June 19, 2004 || Socorro || LINEAR || — || align=right | 2.8 km || 
|-id=677 bgcolor=#d6d6d6
| 147677 ||  || — || July 10, 2004 || Palomar || NEAT || — || align=right | 3.3 km || 
|-id=678 bgcolor=#d6d6d6
| 147678 ||  || — || July 9, 2004 || Socorro || LINEAR || — || align=right | 8.3 km || 
|-id=679 bgcolor=#d6d6d6
| 147679 ||  || — || July 11, 2004 || Socorro || LINEAR || — || align=right | 4.7 km || 
|-id=680 bgcolor=#d6d6d6
| 147680 ||  || — || July 16, 2004 || Socorro || LINEAR || — || align=right | 5.6 km || 
|-id=681 bgcolor=#d6d6d6
| 147681 ||  || — || July 16, 2004 || Socorro || LINEAR || — || align=right | 4.9 km || 
|-id=682 bgcolor=#d6d6d6
| 147682 ||  || — || July 17, 2004 || Reedy Creek || J. Broughton || — || align=right | 5.3 km || 
|-id=683 bgcolor=#d6d6d6
| 147683 ||  || — || July 21, 2004 || Siding Spring || SSS || — || align=right | 3.7 km || 
|-id=684 bgcolor=#d6d6d6
| 147684 ||  || — || August 9, 2004 || Socorro || LINEAR || — || align=right | 3.2 km || 
|-id=685 bgcolor=#d6d6d6
| 147685 ||  || — || August 8, 2004 || Anderson Mesa || LONEOS || VER || align=right | 5.1 km || 
|-id=686 bgcolor=#d6d6d6
| 147686 ||  || — || August 10, 2004 || Campo Imperatore || CINEOS || EOS || align=right | 3.2 km || 
|-id=687 bgcolor=#d6d6d6
| 147687 ||  || — || August 9, 2004 || Socorro || LINEAR || ALA || align=right | 5.6 km || 
|-id=688 bgcolor=#E9E9E9
| 147688 ||  || — || August 7, 2004 || Siding Spring || SSS || — || align=right | 2.0 km || 
|-id=689 bgcolor=#d6d6d6
| 147689 ||  || — || August 9, 2004 || Socorro || LINEAR || — || align=right | 4.5 km || 
|-id=690 bgcolor=#d6d6d6
| 147690 ||  || — || August 16, 2004 || Palomar || NEAT || — || align=right | 3.7 km || 
|-id=691 bgcolor=#d6d6d6
| 147691 ||  || — || September 10, 2004 || Socorro || LINEAR || ALA || align=right | 7.9 km || 
|-id=692 bgcolor=#d6d6d6
| 147692 ||  || — || September 11, 2004 || Socorro || LINEAR || — || align=right | 8.2 km || 
|-id=693 bgcolor=#fefefe
| 147693 Piccioni ||  ||  || February 11, 2005 || La Silla || A. Boattini, H. Scholl || FLO || align=right | 1.3 km || 
|-id=694 bgcolor=#fefefe
| 147694 ||  || — || March 11, 2005 || Mount Lemmon || Mount Lemmon Survey || — || align=right | 1.3 km || 
|-id=695 bgcolor=#fefefe
| 147695 ||  || — || March 11, 2005 || Kitt Peak || Spacewatch || — || align=right | 1.1 km || 
|-id=696 bgcolor=#fefefe
| 147696 ||  || — || April 2, 2005 || Catalina || CSS || PHO || align=right | 1.8 km || 
|-id=697 bgcolor=#fefefe
| 147697 ||  || — || April 3, 2005 || Palomar || NEAT || — || align=right | 1.6 km || 
|-id=698 bgcolor=#fefefe
| 147698 ||  || — || April 4, 2005 || Mount Lemmon || Mount Lemmon Survey || — || align=right | 1.4 km || 
|-id=699 bgcolor=#fefefe
| 147699 ||  || — || April 6, 2005 || Mount Lemmon || Mount Lemmon Survey || — || align=right | 1.3 km || 
|-id=700 bgcolor=#fefefe
| 147700 ||  || — || April 4, 2005 || Kitt Peak || Spacewatch || FLO || align=right | 1.3 km || 
|}

147701–147800 

|-bgcolor=#fefefe
| 147701 ||  || — || April 5, 2005 || Kitt Peak || Spacewatch || NYS || align=right | 1.2 km || 
|-id=702 bgcolor=#E9E9E9
| 147702 ||  || — || April 10, 2005 || Mount Lemmon || Mount Lemmon Survey || — || align=right | 3.0 km || 
|-id=703 bgcolor=#fefefe
| 147703 ||  || — || April 10, 2005 || Kitt Peak || M. W. Buie || — || align=right | 1.5 km || 
|-id=704 bgcolor=#fefefe
| 147704 ||  || — || April 11, 2005 || Kitt Peak || M. W. Buie || — || align=right | 1.2 km || 
|-id=705 bgcolor=#fefefe
| 147705 ||  || — || April 14, 2005 || Catalina || CSS || H || align=right data-sort-value="0.79" | 790 m || 
|-id=706 bgcolor=#fefefe
| 147706 ||  || — || April 9, 2005 || Socorro || LINEAR || — || align=right | 1.5 km || 
|-id=707 bgcolor=#fefefe
| 147707 ||  || — || May 3, 2005 || Kitt Peak || Spacewatch || — || align=right | 1.5 km || 
|-id=708 bgcolor=#fefefe
| 147708 ||  || — || May 4, 2005 || Kitt Peak || Spacewatch || — || align=right | 1.2 km || 
|-id=709 bgcolor=#E9E9E9
| 147709 ||  || — || May 8, 2005 || Kitt Peak || Spacewatch || — || align=right | 2.5 km || 
|-id=710 bgcolor=#fefefe
| 147710 ||  || — || May 8, 2005 || Kitt Peak || Spacewatch || — || align=right | 1.6 km || 
|-id=711 bgcolor=#E9E9E9
| 147711 ||  || — || May 9, 2005 || Kitt Peak || Spacewatch || MAR || align=right | 1.5 km || 
|-id=712 bgcolor=#E9E9E9
| 147712 ||  || — || May 8, 2005 || Mount Lemmon || Mount Lemmon Survey || MRX || align=right | 1.7 km || 
|-id=713 bgcolor=#fefefe
| 147713 ||  || — || May 12, 2005 || Palomar || NEAT || MAS || align=right | 1.1 km || 
|-id=714 bgcolor=#fefefe
| 147714 ||  || — || May 16, 2005 || Palomar || NEAT || — || align=right | 2.2 km || 
|-id=715 bgcolor=#E9E9E9
| 147715 ||  || — || May 18, 2005 || Siding Spring || SSS || — || align=right | 1.6 km || 
|-id=716 bgcolor=#d6d6d6
| 147716 ||  || — || May 19, 2005 || Mount Lemmon || Mount Lemmon Survey || — || align=right | 4.1 km || 
|-id=717 bgcolor=#E9E9E9
| 147717 ||  || — || June 5, 2005 || Socorro || LINEAR || — || align=right | 1.8 km || 
|-id=718 bgcolor=#fefefe
| 147718 ||  || — || June 8, 2005 || Kitt Peak || Spacewatch || — || align=right | 1.1 km || 
|-id=719 bgcolor=#FA8072
| 147719 ||  || — || June 9, 2005 || Catalina || CSS || — || align=right | 1.8 km || 
|-id=720 bgcolor=#fefefe
| 147720 ||  || — || June 13, 2005 || Mount Lemmon || Mount Lemmon Survey || — || align=right | 1.5 km || 
|-id=721 bgcolor=#d6d6d6
| 147721 ||  || — || June 17, 2005 || Mount Lemmon || Mount Lemmon Survey || — || align=right | 3.6 km || 
|-id=722 bgcolor=#fefefe
| 147722 ||  || — || June 21, 2005 || Palomar || NEAT || NYS || align=right | 1.1 km || 
|-id=723 bgcolor=#fefefe
| 147723 ||  || — || June 23, 2005 || Palomar || NEAT || MAS || align=right | 1.6 km || 
|-id=724 bgcolor=#fefefe
| 147724 ||  || — || June 28, 2005 || Palomar || NEAT || LCI || align=right | 2.1 km || 
|-id=725 bgcolor=#fefefe
| 147725 ||  || — || June 29, 2005 || Palomar || NEAT || V || align=right | 1.1 km || 
|-id=726 bgcolor=#E9E9E9
| 147726 ||  || — || June 30, 2005 || Kitt Peak || Spacewatch || — || align=right | 2.1 km || 
|-id=727 bgcolor=#fefefe
| 147727 ||  || — || June 28, 2005 || Palomar || NEAT || — || align=right | 2.1 km || 
|-id=728 bgcolor=#fefefe
| 147728 ||  || — || June 29, 2005 || Kitt Peak || Spacewatch || — || align=right | 1.2 km || 
|-id=729 bgcolor=#fefefe
| 147729 ||  || — || June 29, 2005 || Palomar || NEAT || NYS || align=right | 1.2 km || 
|-id=730 bgcolor=#d6d6d6
| 147730 ||  || — || June 30, 2005 || Kitt Peak || Spacewatch || THM || align=right | 2.8 km || 
|-id=731 bgcolor=#E9E9E9
| 147731 ||  || — || June 30, 2005 || Kitt Peak || Spacewatch || — || align=right | 2.1 km || 
|-id=732 bgcolor=#E9E9E9
| 147732 ||  || — || June 29, 2005 || Kitt Peak || Spacewatch || — || align=right | 2.0 km || 
|-id=733 bgcolor=#E9E9E9
| 147733 ||  || — || June 27, 2005 || Kitt Peak || Spacewatch || — || align=right | 1.5 km || 
|-id=734 bgcolor=#d6d6d6
| 147734 ||  || — || June 29, 2005 || Palomar || NEAT || 628 || align=right | 3.2 km || 
|-id=735 bgcolor=#E9E9E9
| 147735 || 2005 NE || — || July 2, 2005 || Wrightwood || J. W. Young || MAR || align=right | 1.9 km || 
|-id=736 bgcolor=#d6d6d6
| 147736 Raxavinic ||  ||  || July 2, 2005 || RAS || R. Hutsebaut || TRP || align=right | 6.0 km || 
|-id=737 bgcolor=#fefefe
| 147737 ||  || — || July 1, 2005 || Kitt Peak || Spacewatch || V || align=right | 1.2 km || 
|-id=738 bgcolor=#fefefe
| 147738 ||  || — || July 1, 2005 || Kitt Peak || Spacewatch || ERI || align=right | 2.6 km || 
|-id=739 bgcolor=#d6d6d6
| 147739 ||  || — || July 1, 2005 || Kitt Peak || Spacewatch || — || align=right | 4.1 km || 
|-id=740 bgcolor=#E9E9E9
| 147740 ||  || — || July 1, 2005 || Kitt Peak || Spacewatch || AGN || align=right | 1.7 km || 
|-id=741 bgcolor=#fefefe
| 147741 ||  || — || July 3, 2005 || Palomar || NEAT || — || align=right | 3.3 km || 
|-id=742 bgcolor=#fefefe
| 147742 ||  || — || July 5, 2005 || Palomar || NEAT || FLO || align=right | 1.1 km || 
|-id=743 bgcolor=#E9E9E9
| 147743 ||  || — || July 4, 2005 || Kitt Peak || Spacewatch || AST || align=right | 3.0 km || 
|-id=744 bgcolor=#fefefe
| 147744 ||  || — || July 4, 2005 || Kitt Peak || Spacewatch || MAS || align=right | 1.2 km || 
|-id=745 bgcolor=#fefefe
| 147745 ||  || — || July 2, 2005 || Catalina || CSS || — || align=right | 1.9 km || 
|-id=746 bgcolor=#fefefe
| 147746 ||  || — || July 10, 2005 || Kitt Peak || Spacewatch || NYS || align=right data-sort-value="0.89" | 890 m || 
|-id=747 bgcolor=#d6d6d6
| 147747 ||  || — || July 1, 2005 || Kitt Peak || Spacewatch || KOR || align=right | 2.1 km || 
|-id=748 bgcolor=#fefefe
| 147748 ||  || — || July 1, 2005 || Kitt Peak || Spacewatch || — || align=right | 1.0 km || 
|-id=749 bgcolor=#E9E9E9
| 147749 ||  || — || July 4, 2005 || Palomar || NEAT || — || align=right | 1.6 km || 
|-id=750 bgcolor=#d6d6d6
| 147750 ||  || — || July 5, 2005 || Mount Lemmon || Mount Lemmon Survey || — || align=right | 3.1 km || 
|-id=751 bgcolor=#E9E9E9
| 147751 ||  || — || July 27, 2005 || Palomar || NEAT || — || align=right | 2.6 km || 
|-id=752 bgcolor=#E9E9E9
| 147752 ||  || — || July 28, 2005 || Palomar || NEAT || NEM || align=right | 4.1 km || 
|-id=753 bgcolor=#fefefe
| 147753 ||  || — || July 28, 2005 || Palomar || NEAT || NYS || align=right data-sort-value="0.99" | 990 m || 
|-id=754 bgcolor=#fefefe
| 147754 ||  || — || July 29, 2005 || Palomar || NEAT || — || align=right data-sort-value="0.98" | 980 m || 
|-id=755 bgcolor=#E9E9E9
| 147755 ||  || — || July 29, 2005 || Palomar || NEAT || — || align=right | 1.6 km || 
|-id=756 bgcolor=#d6d6d6
| 147756 ||  || — || July 29, 2005 || Palomar || NEAT || EOS || align=right | 3.3 km || 
|-id=757 bgcolor=#d6d6d6
| 147757 ||  || — || July 31, 2005 || Palomar || NEAT || — || align=right | 4.2 km || 
|-id=758 bgcolor=#E9E9E9
| 147758 ||  || — || August 4, 2005 || Palomar || NEAT || WIT || align=right | 1.7 km || 
|-id=759 bgcolor=#d6d6d6
| 147759 ||  || — || August 23, 2005 || Haleakala || NEAT || — || align=right | 3.6 km || 
|-id=760 bgcolor=#d6d6d6
| 147760 ||  || — || August 25, 2005 || Palomar || NEAT || EOS || align=right | 3.2 km || 
|-id=761 bgcolor=#fefefe
| 147761 ||  || — || August 25, 2005 || Campo Imperatore || CINEOS || NYS || align=right | 1.3 km || 
|-id=762 bgcolor=#d6d6d6
| 147762 ||  || — || August 25, 2005 || Palomar || NEAT || — || align=right | 4.7 km || 
|-id=763 bgcolor=#E9E9E9
| 147763 ||  || — || August 26, 2005 || Siding Spring || SSS || EUN || align=right | 2.1 km || 
|-id=764 bgcolor=#d6d6d6
| 147764 ||  || — || August 24, 2005 || Palomar || NEAT || — || align=right | 3.7 km || 
|-id=765 bgcolor=#fefefe
| 147765 ||  || — || August 24, 2005 || Haleakala || NEAT || V || align=right | 1.4 km || 
|-id=766 bgcolor=#d6d6d6
| 147766 Elisatoffoli ||  ||  || August 26, 2005 || CAOS || U. Tagliaferri, F. Mallia || — || align=right | 5.8 km || 
|-id=767 bgcolor=#d6d6d6
| 147767 ||  || — || August 26, 2005 || Palomar || NEAT || — || align=right | 4.1 km || 
|-id=768 bgcolor=#fefefe
| 147768 ||  || — || August 26, 2005 || Palomar || NEAT || MAS || align=right | 1.3 km || 
|-id=769 bgcolor=#fefefe
| 147769 ||  || — || August 26, 2005 || Palomar || NEAT || CLA || align=right | 3.3 km || 
|-id=770 bgcolor=#d6d6d6
| 147770 ||  || — || August 28, 2005 || Kitt Peak || Spacewatch || — || align=right | 3.5 km || 
|-id=771 bgcolor=#d6d6d6
| 147771 ||  || — || August 26, 2005 || Palomar || NEAT || THM || align=right | 4.1 km || 
|-id=772 bgcolor=#E9E9E9
| 147772 ||  || — || August 25, 2005 || Palomar || NEAT || XIZ || align=right | 2.1 km || 
|-id=773 bgcolor=#E9E9E9
| 147773 ||  || — || August 29, 2005 || Anderson Mesa || LONEOS || — || align=right | 1.4 km || 
|-id=774 bgcolor=#fefefe
| 147774 ||  || — || August 22, 2005 || Palomar || NEAT || — || align=right | 1.2 km || 
|-id=775 bgcolor=#d6d6d6
| 147775 ||  || — || August 24, 2005 || Palomar || NEAT || — || align=right | 3.9 km || 
|-id=776 bgcolor=#d6d6d6
| 147776 ||  || — || August 27, 2005 || Palomar || NEAT || HYG || align=right | 5.9 km || 
|-id=777 bgcolor=#fefefe
| 147777 ||  || — || August 27, 2005 || Palomar || NEAT || SUL || align=right | 3.6 km || 
|-id=778 bgcolor=#d6d6d6
| 147778 ||  || — || August 27, 2005 || Palomar || NEAT || — || align=right | 5.1 km || 
|-id=779 bgcolor=#d6d6d6
| 147779 ||  || — || August 27, 2005 || Palomar || NEAT || — || align=right | 7.0 km || 
|-id=780 bgcolor=#E9E9E9
| 147780 ||  || — || August 27, 2005 || Palomar || NEAT || — || align=right | 1.6 km || 
|-id=781 bgcolor=#d6d6d6
| 147781 ||  || — || August 27, 2005 || Palomar || NEAT || — || align=right | 3.8 km || 
|-id=782 bgcolor=#d6d6d6
| 147782 ||  || — || August 28, 2005 || Kitt Peak || Spacewatch || — || align=right | 4.1 km || 
|-id=783 bgcolor=#d6d6d6
| 147783 ||  || — || August 28, 2005 || Kitt Peak || Spacewatch || — || align=right | 4.0 km || 
|-id=784 bgcolor=#fefefe
| 147784 ||  || — || August 28, 2005 || Kitt Peak || Spacewatch || MAS || align=right | 1.1 km || 
|-id=785 bgcolor=#E9E9E9
| 147785 ||  || — || August 28, 2005 || Anderson Mesa || LONEOS || EUN || align=right | 2.6 km || 
|-id=786 bgcolor=#d6d6d6
| 147786 ||  || — || August 31, 2005 || Socorro || LINEAR || — || align=right | 4.2 km || 
|-id=787 bgcolor=#E9E9E9
| 147787 ||  || — || August 30, 2005 || Palomar || NEAT || — || align=right | 3.6 km || 
|-id=788 bgcolor=#d6d6d6
| 147788 ||  || — || August 28, 2005 || Kitt Peak || Spacewatch || — || align=right | 4.6 km || 
|-id=789 bgcolor=#E9E9E9
| 147789 ||  || — || August 28, 2005 || Siding Spring || SSS || — || align=right | 3.4 km || 
|-id=790 bgcolor=#d6d6d6
| 147790 ||  || — || August 29, 2005 || Palomar || NEAT || — || align=right | 5.5 km || 
|-id=791 bgcolor=#d6d6d6
| 147791 ||  || — || August 25, 2005 || Palomar || NEAT || KOR || align=right | 2.0 km || 
|-id=792 bgcolor=#E9E9E9
| 147792 ||  || — || September 1, 2005 || Palomar || NEAT || WIT || align=right | 1.7 km || 
|-id=793 bgcolor=#E9E9E9
| 147793 ||  || — || September 2, 2005 || Palomar || NEAT || — || align=right | 3.1 km || 
|-id=794 bgcolor=#d6d6d6
| 147794 ||  || — || September 2, 2005 || Palomar || NEAT || — || align=right | 5.8 km || 
|-id=795 bgcolor=#E9E9E9
| 147795 ||  || — || September 8, 2005 || Socorro || LINEAR || — || align=right | 4.0 km || 
|-id=796 bgcolor=#E9E9E9
| 147796 ||  || — || September 1, 2005 || Kitt Peak || Spacewatch || — || align=right | 1.8 km || 
|-id=797 bgcolor=#d6d6d6
| 147797 ||  || — || September 1, 2005 || Kitt Peak || Spacewatch || KOR || align=right | 1.7 km || 
|-id=798 bgcolor=#E9E9E9
| 147798 ||  || — || September 2, 2005 || Haleakala || NEAT || — || align=right | 3.7 km || 
|-id=799 bgcolor=#d6d6d6
| 147799 ||  || — || September 15, 2005 || Wrightwood || J. W. Young || KOR || align=right | 2.0 km || 
|-id=800 bgcolor=#E9E9E9
| 147800 ||  || — || September 27, 2005 || Nashville || R. Clingan || AST || align=right | 4.7 km || 
|}

147801–147900 

|-bgcolor=#E9E9E9
| 147801 ||  || — || September 23, 2005 || Kitt Peak || Spacewatch || — || align=right | 1.9 km || 
|-id=802 bgcolor=#E9E9E9
| 147802 ||  || — || September 23, 2005 || Kitt Peak || Spacewatch || — || align=right | 1.6 km || 
|-id=803 bgcolor=#d6d6d6
| 147803 ||  || — || September 25, 2005 || Kitt Peak || Spacewatch || THM || align=right | 3.5 km || 
|-id=804 bgcolor=#d6d6d6
| 147804 ||  || — || September 25, 2005 || Kitt Peak || Spacewatch || — || align=right | 6.4 km || 
|-id=805 bgcolor=#E9E9E9
| 147805 ||  || — || September 27, 2005 || Kitt Peak || Spacewatch || — || align=right | 2.3 km || 
|-id=806 bgcolor=#d6d6d6
| 147806 ||  || — || September 28, 2005 || Palomar || NEAT || — || align=right | 3.3 km || 
|-id=807 bgcolor=#d6d6d6
| 147807 ||  || — || September 23, 2005 || Catalina || CSS || THM || align=right | 4.3 km || 
|-id=808 bgcolor=#d6d6d6
| 147808 ||  || — || September 23, 2005 || Catalina || CSS || EOS || align=right | 3.6 km || 
|-id=809 bgcolor=#E9E9E9
| 147809 ||  || — || September 24, 2005 || Kitt Peak || Spacewatch || AST || align=right | 2.1 km || 
|-id=810 bgcolor=#d6d6d6
| 147810 ||  || — || September 24, 2005 || Kitt Peak || Spacewatch || — || align=right | 3.4 km || 
|-id=811 bgcolor=#E9E9E9
| 147811 ||  || — || September 25, 2005 || Palomar || NEAT || — || align=right | 4.4 km || 
|-id=812 bgcolor=#d6d6d6
| 147812 ||  || — || September 25, 2005 || Palomar || NEAT || — || align=right | 4.0 km || 
|-id=813 bgcolor=#E9E9E9
| 147813 ||  || — || September 26, 2005 || Catalina || CSS || EUN || align=right | 2.1 km || 
|-id=814 bgcolor=#E9E9E9
| 147814 ||  || — || September 26, 2005 || Catalina || CSS || — || align=right | 4.6 km || 
|-id=815 bgcolor=#d6d6d6
| 147815 ||  || — || September 28, 2005 || Palomar || NEAT || — || align=right | 6.3 km || 
|-id=816 bgcolor=#d6d6d6
| 147816 ||  || — || September 29, 2005 || Palomar || NEAT || — || align=right | 3.5 km || 
|-id=817 bgcolor=#d6d6d6
| 147817 ||  || — || September 29, 2005 || Mount Lemmon || Mount Lemmon Survey || THM || align=right | 4.8 km || 
|-id=818 bgcolor=#E9E9E9
| 147818 ||  || — || September 25, 2005 || Kitt Peak || Spacewatch || — || align=right | 3.6 km || 
|-id=819 bgcolor=#E9E9E9
| 147819 ||  || — || September 25, 2005 || Kitt Peak || Spacewatch || — || align=right | 2.9 km || 
|-id=820 bgcolor=#d6d6d6
| 147820 ||  || — || September 28, 2005 || Palomar || NEAT || EOS || align=right | 3.8 km || 
|-id=821 bgcolor=#d6d6d6
| 147821 ||  || — || September 29, 2005 || Palomar || NEAT || — || align=right | 5.9 km || 
|-id=822 bgcolor=#d6d6d6
| 147822 ||  || — || September 29, 2005 || Mount Lemmon || Mount Lemmon Survey || — || align=right | 4.1 km || 
|-id=823 bgcolor=#d6d6d6
| 147823 ||  || — || September 29, 2005 || Kitt Peak || Spacewatch || — || align=right | 4.6 km || 
|-id=824 bgcolor=#d6d6d6
| 147824 ||  || — || September 29, 2005 || Mount Lemmon || Mount Lemmon Survey || THM || align=right | 4.1 km || 
|-id=825 bgcolor=#d6d6d6
| 147825 ||  || — || September 30, 2005 || Anderson Mesa || LONEOS || — || align=right | 5.4 km || 
|-id=826 bgcolor=#d6d6d6
| 147826 ||  || — || September 30, 2005 || Kitt Peak || Spacewatch || ALA || align=right | 6.5 km || 
|-id=827 bgcolor=#E9E9E9
| 147827 ||  || — || September 27, 2005 || Socorro || LINEAR || — || align=right | 3.5 km || 
|-id=828 bgcolor=#d6d6d6
| 147828 ||  || — || September 30, 2005 || Kitt Peak || Spacewatch || THM || align=right | 3.2 km || 
|-id=829 bgcolor=#E9E9E9
| 147829 ||  || — || September 22, 2005 || Palomar || NEAT || — || align=right | 3.9 km || 
|-id=830 bgcolor=#d6d6d6
| 147830 ||  || — || September 27, 2005 || Socorro || LINEAR || — || align=right | 4.8 km || 
|-id=831 bgcolor=#E9E9E9
| 147831 ||  || — || October 1, 2005 || Socorro || LINEAR || — || align=right | 2.9 km || 
|-id=832 bgcolor=#d6d6d6
| 147832 ||  || — || October 1, 2005 || Mount Lemmon || Mount Lemmon Survey || — || align=right | 3.9 km || 
|-id=833 bgcolor=#E9E9E9
| 147833 ||  || — || October 9, 2005 || Great Shefford || Great Shefford Obs. || — || align=right | 3.0 km || 
|-id=834 bgcolor=#d6d6d6
| 147834 ||  || — || October 4, 2005 || Palomar || NEAT || — || align=right | 7.8 km || 
|-id=835 bgcolor=#d6d6d6
| 147835 ||  || — || October 3, 2005 || Kitt Peak || Spacewatch || — || align=right | 5.2 km || 
|-id=836 bgcolor=#d6d6d6
| 147836 ||  || — || October 7, 2005 || Kitt Peak || Spacewatch || SHU3:2 || align=right | 9.5 km || 
|-id=837 bgcolor=#d6d6d6
| 147837 ||  || — || October 8, 2005 || Kitt Peak || Spacewatch || — || align=right | 3.7 km || 
|-id=838 bgcolor=#E9E9E9
| 147838 ||  || — || October 9, 2005 || Kitt Peak || Spacewatch || — || align=right | 1.9 km || 
|-id=839 bgcolor=#d6d6d6
| 147839 ||  || — || October 9, 2005 || Kitt Peak || Spacewatch || — || align=right | 3.7 km || 
|-id=840 bgcolor=#fefefe
| 147840 ||  || — || October 9, 2005 || Kitt Peak || Spacewatch || ERI || align=right | 2.0 km || 
|-id=841 bgcolor=#d6d6d6
| 147841 ||  || — || October 11, 2005 || Anderson Mesa || LONEOS || — || align=right | 5.3 km || 
|-id=842 bgcolor=#d6d6d6
| 147842 ||  || — || October 3, 2005 || Catalina || CSS || — || align=right | 5.4 km || 
|-id=843 bgcolor=#E9E9E9
| 147843 ||  || — || October 7, 2005 || Anderson Mesa || LONEOS || — || align=right | 4.6 km || 
|-id=844 bgcolor=#d6d6d6
| 147844 ||  || — || October 1, 2005 || Catalina || CSS || 7:4 || align=right | 6.3 km || 
|-id=845 bgcolor=#E9E9E9
| 147845 ||  || — || October 22, 2005 || Kitt Peak || Spacewatch || — || align=right | 3.0 km || 
|-id=846 bgcolor=#d6d6d6
| 147846 ||  || — || October 22, 2005 || Catalina || CSS || 3:2 || align=right | 9.3 km || 
|-id=847 bgcolor=#d6d6d6
| 147847 ||  || — || October 23, 2005 || Catalina || CSS || THM || align=right | 3.9 km || 
|-id=848 bgcolor=#d6d6d6
| 147848 ||  || — || October 22, 2005 || Palomar || NEAT || EOS || align=right | 5.4 km || 
|-id=849 bgcolor=#d6d6d6
| 147849 ||  || — || October 24, 2005 || Palomar || NEAT || — || align=right | 5.2 km || 
|-id=850 bgcolor=#d6d6d6
| 147850 ||  || — || October 24, 2005 || Palomar || NEAT || — || align=right | 4.6 km || 
|-id=851 bgcolor=#d6d6d6
| 147851 ||  || — || October 24, 2005 || Palomar || NEAT || — || align=right | 7.5 km || 
|-id=852 bgcolor=#E9E9E9
| 147852 ||  || — || October 22, 2005 || Kitt Peak || Spacewatch || — || align=right | 2.4 km || 
|-id=853 bgcolor=#d6d6d6
| 147853 ||  || — || October 24, 2005 || Kitt Peak || Spacewatch || — || align=right | 4.7 km || 
|-id=854 bgcolor=#E9E9E9
| 147854 ||  || — || October 23, 2005 || Catalina || CSS || EUN || align=right | 2.3 km || 
|-id=855 bgcolor=#d6d6d6
| 147855 ||  || — || October 26, 2005 || Kitt Peak || Spacewatch || — || align=right | 3.6 km || 
|-id=856 bgcolor=#d6d6d6
| 147856 ||  || — || October 31, 2005 || Kitt Peak || Spacewatch || — || align=right | 9.1 km || 
|-id=857 bgcolor=#d6d6d6
| 147857 ||  || — || October 24, 2005 || Palomar || NEAT || — || align=right | 7.0 km || 
|-id=858 bgcolor=#d6d6d6
| 147858 ||  || — || October 27, 2005 || Catalina || CSS || ALA || align=right | 9.3 km || 
|-id=859 bgcolor=#d6d6d6
| 147859 ||  || — || October 31, 2005 || Socorro || LINEAR || HYG || align=right | 6.1 km || 
|-id=860 bgcolor=#fefefe
| 147860 ||  || — || October 22, 2005 || Palomar || NEAT || — || align=right | 1.8 km || 
|-id=861 bgcolor=#d6d6d6
| 147861 ||  || — || October 24, 2005 || Palomar || NEAT || — || align=right | 4.4 km || 
|-id=862 bgcolor=#E9E9E9
| 147862 ||  || — || October 25, 2005 || Catalina || CSS || — || align=right | 3.5 km || 
|-id=863 bgcolor=#E9E9E9
| 147863 ||  || — || November 1, 2005 || Socorro || LINEAR || AST || align=right | 3.0 km || 
|-id=864 bgcolor=#E9E9E9
| 147864 ||  || — || November 3, 2005 || Catalina || CSS || — || align=right | 3.5 km || 
|-id=865 bgcolor=#d6d6d6
| 147865 ||  || — || November 4, 2005 || Mount Lemmon || Mount Lemmon Survey || HIL3:2 || align=right | 11 km || 
|-id=866 bgcolor=#d6d6d6
| 147866 ||  || — || November 3, 2005 || Socorro || LINEAR || — || align=right | 5.8 km || 
|-id=867 bgcolor=#E9E9E9
| 147867 ||  || — || November 1, 2005 || Anderson Mesa || LONEOS || — || align=right | 1.9 km || 
|-id=868 bgcolor=#d6d6d6
| 147868 ||  || — || November 11, 2005 || Socorro || LINEAR || ALA || align=right | 7.2 km || 
|-id=869 bgcolor=#d6d6d6
| 147869 ||  || — || November 28, 2005 || Catalina || CSS || KOR || align=right | 2.5 km || 
|-id=870 bgcolor=#fefefe
| 147870 ||  || — || August 6, 2006 || Anderson Mesa || LONEOS || V || align=right | 1.2 km || 
|-id=871 bgcolor=#E9E9E9
| 147871 ||  || — || August 6, 2006 || Anderson Mesa || LONEOS || — || align=right | 3.1 km || 
|-id=872 bgcolor=#E9E9E9
| 147872 ||  || — || August 17, 2006 || Palomar || NEAT || DOR || align=right | 4.4 km || 
|-id=873 bgcolor=#fefefe
| 147873 ||  || — || August 19, 2006 || Palomar || NEAT || NYS || align=right | 1.2 km || 
|-id=874 bgcolor=#FA8072
| 147874 ||  || — || August 19, 2006 || Goodricke-Pigott || R. A. Tucker || — || align=right | 1.4 km || 
|-id=875 bgcolor=#E9E9E9
| 147875 ||  || — || August 24, 2006 || Socorro || LINEAR || EUN || align=right | 2.2 km || 
|-id=876 bgcolor=#E9E9E9
| 147876 ||  || — || August 27, 2006 || Goodricke-Pigott || R. A. Tucker || EUN || align=right | 3.4 km || 
|-id=877 bgcolor=#E9E9E9
| 147877 ||  || — || August 23, 2006 || Socorro || LINEAR || — || align=right | 3.3 km || 
|-id=878 bgcolor=#fefefe
| 147878 ||  || — || August 24, 2006 || Socorro || LINEAR || V || align=right | 1.3 km || 
|-id=879 bgcolor=#E9E9E9
| 147879 ||  || — || August 24, 2006 || Palomar || NEAT || — || align=right | 3.5 km || 
|-id=880 bgcolor=#E9E9E9
| 147880 ||  || — || August 24, 2006 || Socorro || LINEAR || — || align=right | 3.0 km || 
|-id=881 bgcolor=#E9E9E9
| 147881 ||  || — || August 27, 2006 || Anderson Mesa || LONEOS || AEO || align=right | 1.9 km || 
|-id=882 bgcolor=#d6d6d6
| 147882 ||  || — || August 29, 2006 || Anderson Mesa || LONEOS || — || align=right | 5.8 km || 
|-id=883 bgcolor=#fefefe
| 147883 ||  || — || September 14, 2006 || Catalina || CSS || MAS || align=right | 1.0 km || 
|-id=884 bgcolor=#fefefe
| 147884 ||  || — || September 14, 2006 || Catalina || CSS || ERI || align=right | 2.3 km || 
|-id=885 bgcolor=#fefefe
| 147885 ||  || — || September 14, 2006 || Kitt Peak || Spacewatch || MAS || align=right | 1.1 km || 
|-id=886 bgcolor=#fefefe
| 147886 ||  || — || September 14, 2006 || Kitt Peak || Spacewatch || V || align=right | 1.2 km || 
|-id=887 bgcolor=#fefefe
| 147887 ||  || — || September 14, 2006 || Catalina || CSS || V || align=right | 1.1 km || 
|-id=888 bgcolor=#fefefe
| 147888 ||  || — || September 15, 2006 || Socorro || LINEAR || V || align=right data-sort-value="0.99" | 990 m || 
|-id=889 bgcolor=#E9E9E9
| 147889 ||  || — || September 15, 2006 || Kitt Peak || Spacewatch || — || align=right | 3.6 km || 
|-id=890 bgcolor=#fefefe
| 147890 ||  || — || September 15, 2006 || Kitt Peak || Spacewatch || — || align=right | 1.2 km || 
|-id=891 bgcolor=#E9E9E9
| 147891 ||  || — || September 14, 2006 || Kitt Peak || Spacewatch || — || align=right | 2.2 km || 
|-id=892 bgcolor=#fefefe
| 147892 ||  || — || September 15, 2006 || Kitt Peak || Spacewatch || — || align=right | 1.1 km || 
|-id=893 bgcolor=#fefefe
| 147893 || 2006 SH || — || September 16, 2006 || 7300 Observatory || W. K. Y. Yeung || NYS || align=right | 1.2 km || 
|-id=894 bgcolor=#E9E9E9
| 147894 ||  || — || September 16, 2006 || Palomar || NEAT || MIS || align=right | 3.3 km || 
|-id=895 bgcolor=#fefefe
| 147895 ||  || — || September 16, 2006 || Catalina || CSS || — || align=right | 1.4 km || 
|-id=896 bgcolor=#fefefe
| 147896 ||  || — || September 16, 2006 || Palomar || NEAT || NYS || align=right data-sort-value="0.96" | 960 m || 
|-id=897 bgcolor=#fefefe
| 147897 ||  || — || September 16, 2006 || Catalina || CSS || — || align=right | 1.6 km || 
|-id=898 bgcolor=#E9E9E9
| 147898 ||  || — || September 17, 2006 || Socorro || LINEAR || HEN || align=right | 1.9 km || 
|-id=899 bgcolor=#E9E9E9
| 147899 ||  || — || September 17, 2006 || Kitt Peak || Spacewatch || — || align=right | 1.2 km || 
|-id=900 bgcolor=#E9E9E9
| 147900 ||  || — || September 18, 2006 || Anderson Mesa || LONEOS || — || align=right | 1.5 km || 
|}

147901–148000 

|-bgcolor=#E9E9E9
| 147901 ||  || — || September 17, 2006 || Anderson Mesa || LONEOS || — || align=right | 2.3 km || 
|-id=902 bgcolor=#d6d6d6
| 147902 ||  || — || September 17, 2006 || Catalina || CSS || EUP || align=right | 7.7 km || 
|-id=903 bgcolor=#fefefe
| 147903 ||  || — || September 19, 2006 || Socorro || LINEAR || ERI || align=right | 2.7 km || 
|-id=904 bgcolor=#fefefe
| 147904 ||  || — || September 18, 2006 || Catalina || CSS || V || align=right data-sort-value="0.90" | 900 m || 
|-id=905 bgcolor=#d6d6d6
| 147905 ||  || — || September 18, 2006 || Catalina || CSS || — || align=right | 6.2 km || 
|-id=906 bgcolor=#d6d6d6
| 147906 ||  || — || September 18, 2006 || Kitt Peak || Spacewatch || URS || align=right | 6.6 km || 
|-id=907 bgcolor=#E9E9E9
| 147907 ||  || — || September 19, 2006 || Kitt Peak || Spacewatch || — || align=right | 2.5 km || 
|-id=908 bgcolor=#E9E9E9
| 147908 ||  || — || September 19, 2006 || Kitt Peak || Spacewatch || WIT || align=right | 1.4 km || 
|-id=909 bgcolor=#E9E9E9
| 147909 ||  || — || October 12, 2006 || Kitt Peak || Spacewatch || — || align=right | 2.9 km || 
|-id=910 bgcolor=#E9E9E9
| 147910 ||  || — || October 12, 2006 || Kitt Peak || Spacewatch || — || align=right | 4.5 km || 
|-id=911 bgcolor=#fefefe
| 147911 ||  || — || October 12, 2006 || Kitt Peak || Spacewatch || — || align=right | 1.3 km || 
|-id=912 bgcolor=#d6d6d6
| 147912 ||  || — || October 12, 2006 || Kitt Peak || Spacewatch || — || align=right | 3.6 km || 
|-id=913 bgcolor=#E9E9E9
| 147913 ||  || — || October 15, 2006 || Catalina || CSS || — || align=right | 3.9 km || 
|-id=914 bgcolor=#d6d6d6
| 147914 ||  || — || October 16, 2006 || Kitt Peak || Spacewatch || — || align=right | 4.2 km || 
|-id=915 bgcolor=#E9E9E9
| 147915 ||  || — || October 18, 2006 || Kitt Peak || Spacewatch || — || align=right | 2.9 km || 
|-id=916 bgcolor=#d6d6d6
| 147916 ||  || — || October 21, 2006 || Kitt Peak || Spacewatch || 7:4 || align=right | 7.6 km || 
|-id=917 bgcolor=#d6d6d6
| 147917 ||  || — || October 21, 2006 || Kitt Peak || Spacewatch || — || align=right | 3.3 km || 
|-id=918 bgcolor=#fefefe
| 147918 Chiayi ||  ||  || October 25, 2006 || Lulin Observatory || Q.-z. Ye, H.-C. Lin || — || align=right | 1.0 km || 
|-id=919 bgcolor=#fefefe
| 147919 ||  || — || October 30, 2006 || Kitami || K. Endate || V || align=right data-sort-value="0.92" | 920 m || 
|-id=920 bgcolor=#d6d6d6
| 147920 ||  || — || October 18, 2006 || Kitt Peak || Spacewatch || — || align=right | 4.5 km || 
|-id=921 bgcolor=#d6d6d6
| 147921 ||  || — || October 27, 2006 || Mount Lemmon || Mount Lemmon Survey || KOR || align=right | 1.8 km || 
|-id=922 bgcolor=#d6d6d6
| 147922 ||  || — || October 28, 2006 || Mount Lemmon || Mount Lemmon Survey || — || align=right | 5.4 km || 
|-id=923 bgcolor=#d6d6d6
| 147923 ||  || — || November 11, 2006 || Catalina || CSS || — || align=right | 4.2 km || 
|-id=924 bgcolor=#d6d6d6
| 147924 ||  || — || November 11, 2006 || Catalina || CSS || HYG || align=right | 3.7 km || 
|-id=925 bgcolor=#E9E9E9
| 147925 ||  || — || November 12, 2006 || Mount Lemmon || Mount Lemmon Survey || — || align=right | 1.6 km || 
|-id=926 bgcolor=#d6d6d6
| 147926 ||  || — || November 15, 2006 || Catalina || CSS || — || align=right | 4.5 km || 
|-id=927 bgcolor=#d6d6d6
| 147927 ||  || — || November 15, 2006 || Kitt Peak || Spacewatch || THM || align=right | 3.3 km || 
|-id=928 bgcolor=#fefefe
| 147928 ||  || — || November 15, 2006 || Kitt Peak || Spacewatch || — || align=right | 1.2 km || 
|-id=929 bgcolor=#d6d6d6
| 147929 ||  || — || November 16, 2006 || Socorro || LINEAR || — || align=right | 5.9 km || 
|-id=930 bgcolor=#d6d6d6
| 147930 ||  || — || November 22, 2006 || 7300 Observatory || W. K. Y. Yeung || — || align=right | 3.8 km || 
|-id=931 bgcolor=#d6d6d6
| 147931 ||  || — || November 19, 2006 || Kitt Peak || Spacewatch || — || align=right | 3.5 km || 
|-id=932 bgcolor=#fefefe
| 147932 || 3043 P-L || — || September 24, 1960 || Palomar || PLS || — || align=right | 1.3 km || 
|-id=933 bgcolor=#fefefe
| 147933 || 4744 P-L || — || September 24, 1960 || Palomar || PLS || — || align=right | 1.1 km || 
|-id=934 bgcolor=#fefefe
| 147934 || 6302 P-L || — || September 24, 1960 || Palomar || PLS || MAS || align=right | 1.0 km || 
|-id=935 bgcolor=#E9E9E9
| 147935 || 6620 P-L || — || September 24, 1960 || Palomar || PLS || — || align=right | 3.6 km || 
|-id=936 bgcolor=#fefefe
| 147936 || 6728 P-L || — || September 24, 1960 || Palomar || PLS || NYS || align=right data-sort-value="0.86" | 860 m || 
|-id=937 bgcolor=#fefefe
| 147937 || 1038 T-2 || — || September 29, 1973 || Palomar || PLS || — || align=right | 1.0 km || 
|-id=938 bgcolor=#fefefe
| 147938 || 1119 T-2 || — || September 29, 1973 || Palomar || PLS || FLO || align=right | 1.1 km || 
|-id=939 bgcolor=#fefefe
| 147939 || 1413 T-2 || — || September 30, 1973 || Palomar || PLS || NYS || align=right data-sort-value="0.79" | 790 m || 
|-id=940 bgcolor=#E9E9E9
| 147940 || 2203 T-2 || — || September 29, 1973 || Palomar || PLS || — || align=right | 1.6 km || 
|-id=941 bgcolor=#fefefe
| 147941 || 4134 T-2 || — || September 29, 1973 || Palomar || PLS || MAS || align=right | 1.1 km || 
|-id=942 bgcolor=#d6d6d6
| 147942 || 1058 T-3 || — || October 17, 1977 || Palomar || PLS || — || align=right | 5.1 km || 
|-id=943 bgcolor=#fefefe
| 147943 || 1209 T-3 || — || October 17, 1977 || Palomar || PLS || V || align=right | 1.0 km || 
|-id=944 bgcolor=#E9E9E9
| 147944 || 3448 T-3 || — || October 16, 1977 || Palomar || PLS || — || align=right | 1.7 km || 
|-id=945 bgcolor=#fefefe
| 147945 || 4021 T-3 || — || October 16, 1977 || Palomar || PLS || NYS || align=right | 1.1 km || 
|-id=946 bgcolor=#fefefe
| 147946 || 4084 T-3 || — || October 16, 1977 || Palomar || PLS || NYS || align=right data-sort-value="0.86" | 860 m || 
|-id=947 bgcolor=#E9E9E9
| 147947 || 4187 T-3 || — || October 16, 1977 || Palomar || PLS || — || align=right | 2.3 km || 
|-id=948 bgcolor=#d6d6d6
| 147948 || 4211 T-3 || — || October 16, 1977 || Palomar || PLS || VER || align=right | 5.6 km || 
|-id=949 bgcolor=#E9E9E9
| 147949 || 4284 T-3 || — || October 16, 1977 || Palomar || PLS || — || align=right | 1.8 km || 
|-id=950 bgcolor=#d6d6d6
| 147950 || 4642 T-3 || — || October 16, 1977 || Palomar || PLS || VER || align=right | 5.8 km || 
|-id=951 bgcolor=#d6d6d6
| 147951 || 5156 T-3 || — || October 16, 1977 || Palomar || PLS || — || align=right | 5.9 km || 
|-id=952 bgcolor=#E9E9E9
| 147952 ||  || — || January 26, 1984 || Palomar || B. A. Skiff || — || align=right | 4.0 km || 
|-id=953 bgcolor=#fefefe
| 147953 ||  || — || March 21, 1993 || La Silla || UESAC || — || align=right | 1.5 km || 
|-id=954 bgcolor=#E9E9E9
| 147954 ||  || — || September 15, 1993 || La Silla || E. W. Elst || — || align=right | 1.5 km || 
|-id=955 bgcolor=#fefefe
| 147955 ||  || — || October 15, 1993 || Kitt Peak || Spacewatch || — || align=right | 2.7 km || 
|-id=956 bgcolor=#E9E9E9
| 147956 ||  || — || October 15, 1993 || Kitt Peak || Spacewatch || — || align=right | 1.8 km || 
|-id=957 bgcolor=#E9E9E9
| 147957 ||  || — || October 10, 1993 || Palomar || H. E. Holt || — || align=right | 3.1 km || 
|-id=958 bgcolor=#E9E9E9
| 147958 ||  || — || October 9, 1993 || La Silla || E. W. Elst || — || align=right | 1.2 km || 
|-id=959 bgcolor=#E9E9E9
| 147959 ||  || — || October 9, 1993 || La Silla || E. W. Elst || — || align=right | 1.3 km || 
|-id=960 bgcolor=#fefefe
| 147960 ||  || — || February 10, 1994 || Kitt Peak || Spacewatch || — || align=right | 1.2 km || 
|-id=961 bgcolor=#fefefe
| 147961 ||  || — || March 5, 1994 || Kitt Peak || Spacewatch || V || align=right data-sort-value="0.76" | 760 m || 
|-id=962 bgcolor=#fefefe
| 147962 ||  || — || April 6, 1994 || Kitt Peak || Spacewatch || MAS || align=right data-sort-value="0.94" | 940 m || 
|-id=963 bgcolor=#fefefe
| 147963 ||  || — || May 4, 1994 || Kitt Peak || Spacewatch || FLO || align=right | 1.7 km || 
|-id=964 bgcolor=#fefefe
| 147964 ||  || — || August 10, 1994 || La Silla || E. W. Elst || NYS || align=right | 1.4 km || 
|-id=965 bgcolor=#d6d6d6
| 147965 ||  || — || August 10, 1994 || La Silla || E. W. Elst || — || align=right | 4.5 km || 
|-id=966 bgcolor=#fefefe
| 147966 ||  || — || August 12, 1994 || La Silla || E. W. Elst || — || align=right | 1.4 km || 
|-id=967 bgcolor=#E9E9E9
| 147967 ||  || — || August 10, 1994 || La Silla || E. W. Elst || — || align=right | 1.8 km || 
|-id=968 bgcolor=#d6d6d6
| 147968 ||  || — || October 6, 1994 || Kitt Peak || Spacewatch || — || align=right | 5.3 km || 
|-id=969 bgcolor=#E9E9E9
| 147969 ||  || — || October 6, 1994 || Kitt Peak || Spacewatch || — || align=right | 1.2 km || 
|-id=970 bgcolor=#fefefe
| 147970 ||  || — || October 26, 1994 || Kitt Peak || Spacewatch || NYS || align=right data-sort-value="0.98" | 980 m || 
|-id=971 bgcolor=#d6d6d6
| 147971 Nametoko || 1994 WF ||  || November 24, 1994 || Kuma Kogen || A. Nakamura || HYG || align=right | 4.6 km || 
|-id=972 bgcolor=#E9E9E9
| 147972 ||  || — || March 1, 1995 || Kitt Peak || Spacewatch || — || align=right | 1.2 km || 
|-id=973 bgcolor=#E9E9E9
| 147973 ||  || — || March 23, 1995 || Kitt Peak || Spacewatch || — || align=right | 1.2 km || 
|-id=974 bgcolor=#fefefe
| 147974 ||  || — || April 26, 1995 || Kitt Peak || Spacewatch || NYS || align=right data-sort-value="0.87" | 870 m || 
|-id=975 bgcolor=#d6d6d6
| 147975 ||  || — || August 22, 1995 || Kitt Peak || Spacewatch || CHA || align=right | 3.3 km || 
|-id=976 bgcolor=#d6d6d6
| 147976 ||  || — || September 19, 1995 || Kitt Peak || Spacewatch || — || align=right | 3.3 km || 
|-id=977 bgcolor=#E9E9E9
| 147977 ||  || — || September 18, 1995 || Kitt Peak || Spacewatch || — || align=right | 3.1 km || 
|-id=978 bgcolor=#d6d6d6
| 147978 ||  || — || September 22, 1995 || Kitt Peak || Spacewatch || — || align=right | 3.3 km || 
|-id=979 bgcolor=#d6d6d6
| 147979 ||  || — || September 25, 1995 || Kitt Peak || Spacewatch || THM || align=right | 2.5 km || 
|-id=980 bgcolor=#fefefe
| 147980 ||  || — || September 25, 1995 || Kitt Peak || Spacewatch || NYS || align=right data-sort-value="0.93" | 930 m || 
|-id=981 bgcolor=#fefefe
| 147981 ||  || — || October 17, 1995 || Kitt Peak || Spacewatch || — || align=right | 1.3 km || 
|-id=982 bgcolor=#fefefe
| 147982 ||  || — || October 17, 1995 || Kitt Peak || Spacewatch || — || align=right data-sort-value="0.96" | 960 m || 
|-id=983 bgcolor=#fefefe
| 147983 ||  || — || November 15, 1995 || Kitt Peak || Spacewatch || NYS || align=right | 2.3 km || 
|-id=984 bgcolor=#fefefe
| 147984 ||  || — || November 20, 1995 || Oizumi || T. Kobayashi || — || align=right | 1.4 km || 
|-id=985 bgcolor=#fefefe
| 147985 ||  || — || November 23, 1995 || Farra d'Isonzo || Farra d'Isonzo || — || align=right | 1.5 km || 
|-id=986 bgcolor=#fefefe
| 147986 ||  || — || November 17, 1995 || Kitt Peak || Spacewatch || — || align=right | 1.1 km || 
|-id=987 bgcolor=#fefefe
| 147987 ||  || — || November 17, 1995 || Kitt Peak || Spacewatch || — || align=right | 2.2 km || 
|-id=988 bgcolor=#FA8072
| 147988 ||  || — || December 18, 1995 || Kitt Peak || Spacewatch || — || align=right data-sort-value="0.79" | 790 m || 
|-id=989 bgcolor=#fefefe
| 147989 ||  || — || December 18, 1995 || Kitt Peak || Spacewatch || — || align=right | 1.4 km || 
|-id=990 bgcolor=#d6d6d6
| 147990 ||  || — || December 18, 1995 || Kitt Peak || Spacewatch || THB || align=right | 4.2 km || 
|-id=991 bgcolor=#fefefe
| 147991 ||  || — || January 13, 1996 || Kitt Peak || Spacewatch || NYS || align=right data-sort-value="0.85" | 850 m || 
|-id=992 bgcolor=#d6d6d6
| 147992 ||  || — || January 24, 1996 || Kitt Peak || Spacewatch || — || align=right | 5.9 km || 
|-id=993 bgcolor=#fefefe
| 147993 ||  || — || March 19, 1996 || Kitt Peak || Spacewatch || NYS || align=right | 1.4 km || 
|-id=994 bgcolor=#fefefe
| 147994 ||  || — || April 13, 1996 || Kitt Peak || Spacewatch || MAS || align=right | 1.1 km || 
|-id=995 bgcolor=#E9E9E9
| 147995 ||  || — || April 13, 1996 || Kitt Peak || Spacewatch || — || align=right | 3.0 km || 
|-id=996 bgcolor=#d6d6d6
| 147996 ||  || — || September 6, 1996 || Kitt Peak || Spacewatch || KOR || align=right | 1.5 km || 
|-id=997 bgcolor=#FA8072
| 147997 ||  || — || September 14, 1996 || Haleakala || NEAT || — || align=right | 1.3 km || 
|-id=998 bgcolor=#E9E9E9
| 147998 ||  || — || November 12, 1996 || Prescott || P. G. Comba || — || align=right | 3.4 km || 
|-id=999 bgcolor=#d6d6d6
| 147999 ||  || — || January 2, 1997 || Xinglong || SCAP || — || align=right | 4.0 km || 
|-id=000 bgcolor=#fefefe
| 148000 ||  || — || March 2, 1997 || Kitt Peak || Spacewatch || FLO || align=right | 2.0 km || 
|}

References

External links 
 Discovery Circumstances: Numbered Minor Planets (145001)–(150000) (IAU Minor Planet Center)

0147